= List of English Baroque composers =

This is a list of English composers from the Baroque period in alphabetical order:

- Charles Avison (1709–1770)
- John Banister (c. 1624/1630–1679)
- John Baston (fl. 1708–1739)
- Anthony Beck (died 1674)
- John Blow (1649–1708)
- William Boyce (1711-1779)
- Thomas Brewer (1611–c. 1660)
- Richard Browne (fl 1614–1629)
- Richard Browne (c.1630–1664)
- Richard Browne (d. 1710)
- Albertus Bryne (1621–1668)
- Richard Carter (fl 1728–1757)
- William Child (1606–1697)
- Jeremiah Clarke (1674–1707)
- Thomas Clayton (1673–1725)
- Henry Cooke (1615–1672)
- William Corbett (1680–1748)
- William Croft (1678–1727)
- Richard Davis (died 1688)
- Giovanni Battista Draghi (c. 1640–1708)
- Henry Eccles (1670–1742)
- John Eccles (1668–1735)
- John Galliard (1687–1749)
- John Gamble (fl. from 1641, died 1687)
- Christopher Gibbons (1615–1676)
- Maurice Greene (1696–1755)
- George Frideric Handel (1685–1759)
- Pelham Humfrey (1647–1674)
- John Jenkins (1592–1678)
- Richard Jones (late 17th century–1744)
- Richard Justice (died 1757)
- Nicholas Lanier (1588–1666)
- Henry Lawes (1595–1662)
- William Lawes (1602–1645)
- Matthew Locke (1621–1677)
- Thomas Mace (c. 1613–1709?)
- Richard Mico (1590–1661)
- Johann Christoph Pepusch (1667–1752)
- John Playford (1623–1686/7)
- Daniel Purcell (1664–1717)
- Henry Purcell (1659–1695)
- John Ravenscroft (c. 1650?–1708)
- Thomas Roseingrave (1688–1766)
- Christopher Simpson (c. 1602/1606–1669)
- Thomas Tudway (c. 1656–1726)
- William Turner (1651–1740)
- Robert Valentine (c. 1671–1747)
- William Webb (c. 1600–after 1656)
- John Weldon (1676–1736)
- John Wilson (1595–1674)
- Michael Wise (1647–1687)
- Robert Woodcock (c. 1690–1728)

== See also ==
- Early music of the British Isles
- Chronological list of English classical composers
- List of Baroque composers
- List of English Renaissance composers
