= Baroque music of the British Isles =

Aspect of British culture

George Frideric Handel, a leading figure of early 18th century British baroque music

Baroque music of the British Isles bridged the gap between the early music of the Medieval and Renaissance periods and the development of fully fledged and formalised orchestral classical music in the second half of the eighteenth century. It was characterised by more elaborate musical ornamentation, changes in musical notation, new instrumental playing techniques and the rise of new genres such as opera. Although the term Baroque is conventionally used for European music from about 1600, its full effects were not felt in Britain until after 1660, delayed by native trends and developments in music, religious and cultural differences from many European countries and the disruption to court music caused by the Wars of the Three Kingdoms and Interregnum.

Under the restored Stuart monarchy the court became once again a centre of musical patronage, but royal interest in music tended to be less significant as the seventeenth century progressed, to be revived again under the House of Hanover. The Baroque era in British music can be seen as one of an interaction of national and international trends, sometimes absorbing continental fashions and practices and sometimes attempting, as in the creation of ballad opera, to produce an indigenous tradition. However, arguably the most significant British composer of the era, George Frideric Handel, was a naturalised German, who helped integrate British and continental music and define the future of music in the United Kingdom.

== Charles II ==
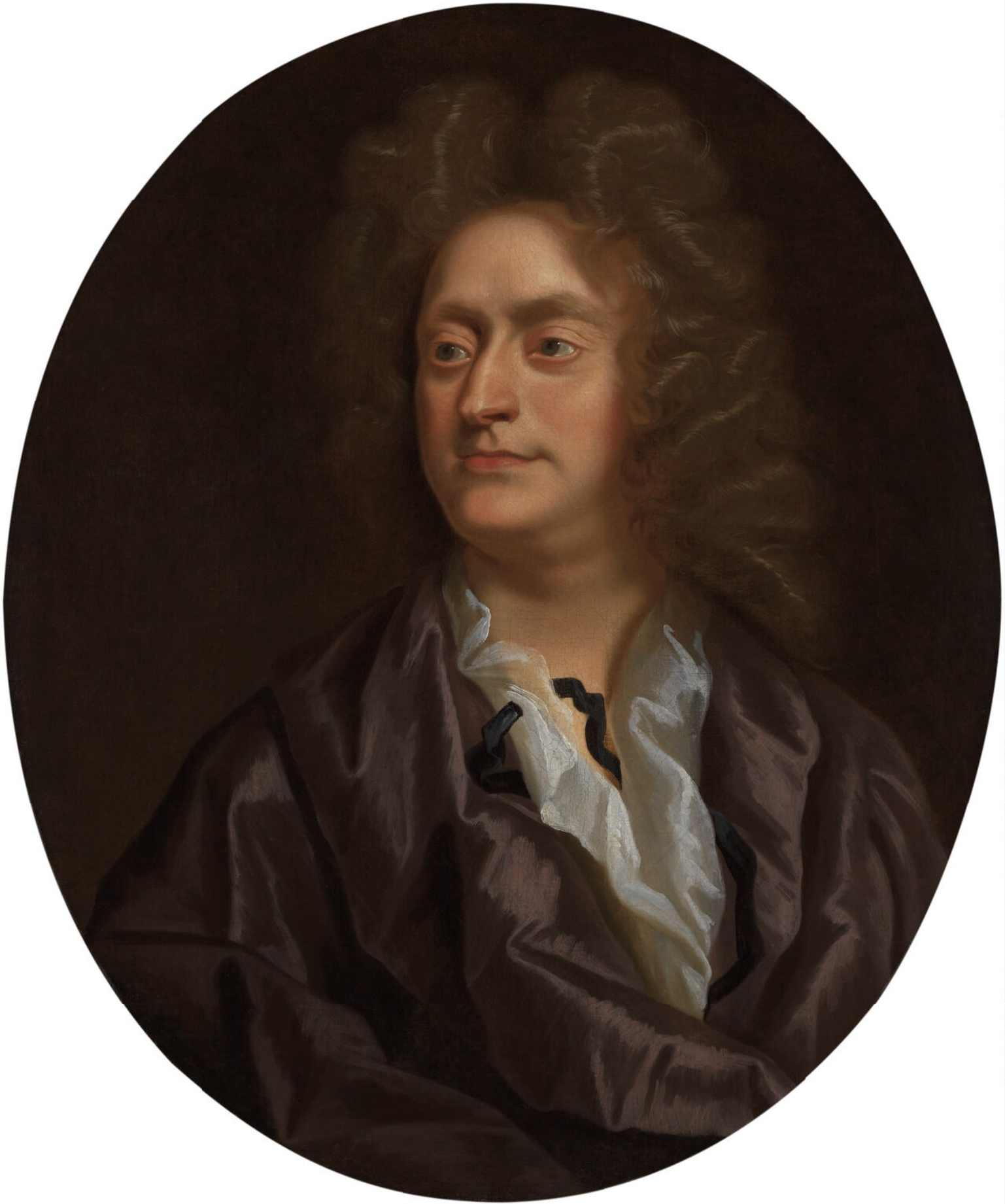
Henry Purcell (1659–95), whose early career was devoted to secular music and later by sacred music

Following the Stuart Restoration of the English monarchy in 1660, Charles II made the court once more the centre of musical patronage in Britain, the theatres were reopened and, after the introduction of a new Book of Common Prayer in 1662, choral music began to be developed again. The king's time on the continent, his (hidden) preference for Catholicism and explicit desire for entertainment led to the embracing of the Baroque and continental forms of music. The court became something of a crossroads of European musicians and styles on a much grander scale than previously achieved. It was probably in these circumstances that Welsh musicians at the court encountered the Italian triple harp, which they adopted and which by the end of the century had supplanted simpler harps to become a national Welsh symbol. As well as encouraging many French musicians to join his court, the king dispatched the young Pelham Humfrey (1647–74) to study in Paris, probably in 1665. When he returned he became the Master of the Children of the Chapel Royal and composer to the Court. Although he died aged only 27 he was highly influential on other English composers like William Turner (1651–1740), John Blow (1649–1708) and Henry Purcell (1659–95). Early in his career Purcell wrote secular music, including for the theatre. Later, as organist of Westminster Abbey and the Chapel Royal, he devoted himself to sacred music. In both fields he emerged as the most influential British composer of the era.

== English opera ==
It was directly due to Charles II's patronage that English language opera, which had briefly surfaced in the 1650s, was re-established in the 1670s. In 1673, Thomas Shadwell's Psyche, patterned on the 1671 'comédie-ballet' of the same name produced by Molière and Jean-Baptiste Lully, marked the revival of the genre. William Davenant produced The Tempest in the same year, which was the first Shakespeare play to be set to music (composed by Locke and Johnson). About 1683, Blow composed Venus and Adonis, often thought of as the first true English-language opera.

Purcell produced Dido and Aeneas (1689), often described as the finest in the genre, in which the action is furthered by the use of Italian-style recitative, but much of Purcell's best work was not involved in the composing of typical opera, but instead he usually worked within the constraints of the semi-opera format, where isolated scenes and masques are contained within the structure of a spoken play, such as Shakespeare's Midsummer Night's Dream in his The Fairy-Queen (1692) or Beaumont and Fletcher dramas in The Prophetess (1690) and Bonduca (1696). The main characters of the play tended not to be involved in the musical scenes, which meant that Purcell was rarely able to develop his characters through song. Despite these hindrances, his aim (and that of his collaborator John Dryden) was to establish serious opera as a dramatic form in England, but these hopes ended with Purcell's early death at the age of 37 in 1695 and English opera gradually fell out of favour and Italian opera began to dominate.

== Court music after the Glorious Revolution ==
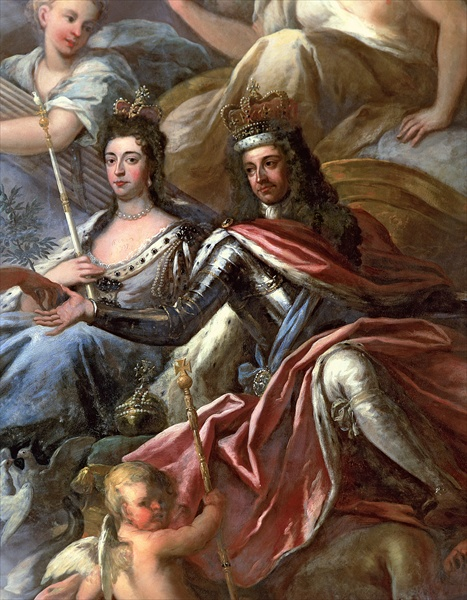
William III and Mary II depicted on the ceiling of the Painted Hall, Greenwich, whose accession limited the scale of Baroque music.

After the death of Charles II in 1685, royal patronage of music became less significant. In the short and troubled reign of his successor James II (1685–88), whose more overt Catholicism, together with his preference for Italian music and musicians, limited patronage of Anglican church music and the Chapel Royal, English composers were pushed towards secular music.

Under William III and Mary II (1689–1702) there was an emphasis on combating rebellion and foreign policy, rather than on culture. There was also a reaction against the Catholic and French culture of the court of Louis XIV, resulting in limitations on some elements of the Baroque, most obviously reflected in the royal couple's orders to remove orchestration from anthems from 1689 and from the Chapel Royal in general from 1691, meaning that royal patronage for orchestrated works now only extended to special occasions.

The last of the Stuarts, Queen Anne (1702–14), had a reputation for being uninterested in culture, but she had a considerable musical education and some talent. As a princess she was a patron of Purcell, Turner and Blow and from the early years of her reign she sponsored compositions for Royal processions and occasions including her coronation and the Acts of Union in 1707, which created the Kingdom of Great Britain.

Anne's successor George Elector of Hanover, king of Great Britain and Ireland from 1714 to 1727 as George I, was perhaps the most musically minded monarch of the era, bringing German and Italian music and musicians with him when he acceded to the throne, among them George Frideric Handel.

== George Frideric Handel ==
The leading figure in British music of the early 18th century was a naturalized Briton, George Frideric Handel (1685–1759). Although he was born in Germany, he first visited England in 1710, later moving there and becoming a naturalised citizen, playing a defining role in the music of the British Isles. Handel drew heavily on the continental, particularly Italian, Baroque style, but was also highly influenced by English composers such as Purcell. He was a prolific composer, producing major orchestral works such as the Water Music, and the Music for the Royal Fireworks. His opera, including Rinaldo (1711, 1731), Orlando (1733), Ariodante (1735), Alcina (1735) and Serse (1738, also known as Xerxes), helped make Britain second only to Italy as a centre of operatic production. His sacred drama and choral music, particularly the coronation anthem Zadok the Priest (written for the inauguration of George II in 1727) which has remained part of the ceremony for British monarchs, and above all, the Messiah, helped set the British taste in music for the next 200 years. He was a major influence on future classical composers including Haydn, Mozart and Beethoven.

== Ballad opera ==
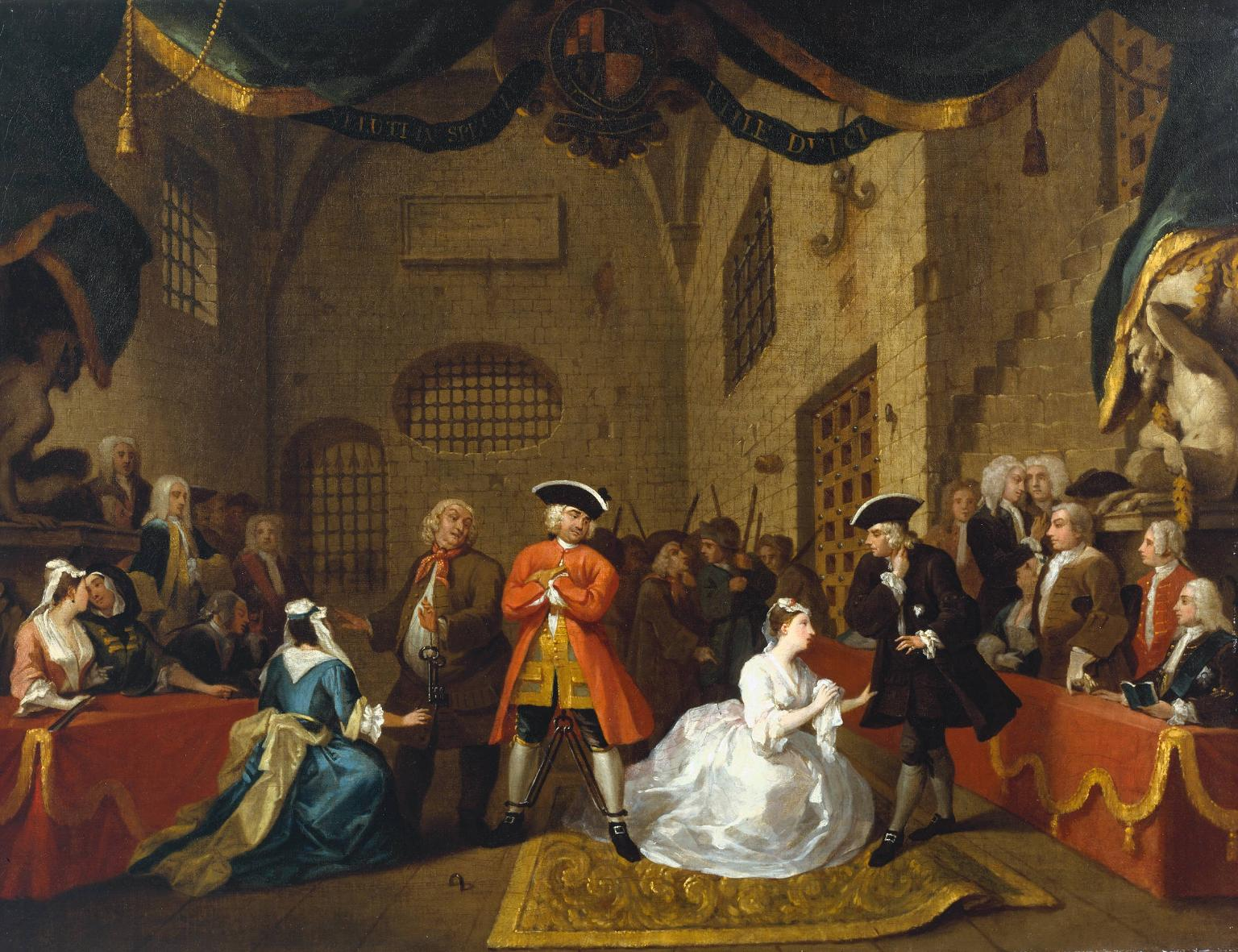
Painting based on The Beggar's Opera, Scene V, by William Hogarth, c. 1728

Ballad operas developed as a form of English stage entertainment, partly in opposition to the Italian domination of the London operatic scene. It consisted of racy and often satirical spoken (English) dialogue, interspersed with songs that were deliberately kept very short to minimize disruptions to the flow of the story. Subject matter involved the lower, often criminal, orders, and typically showed a suspension (or inversion) of the high moral values of the Italian opera of the period. The first, most important and successful was The Beggar's Opera of 1728, with a libretto by John Gay and music arranged by John Christopher Pepusch, both of whom probably influenced by Parisian vaudeville and the burlesques and musical plays of Thomas D'Urfey (1653–1723), a number of whose collected ballads they used in their work. Gay produced further works in this style, including a sequel under the title Polly and he was followed by many other composers. There was also a general revival in English language opera in the 1730s, largely attributed to Thomas Arne, the first English composer to experiment with Italian-style all-sung comic opera, unsuccessfully in The Temple of Dullness (1745), Henry and Emma (1749) and Don Saverio (1750), but triumphantly in Thomas and Sally (1760). His opera Artaxerxes (1762) was the first attempt to set a full-blown opera seria in English and was a huge success, holding the stage until the 1830s. Arne played a major role in moving the ballad opera into a more pastoral form, together with Isaac Bickerstaffe producing Love in a Village (1763) using more original music that imitated, rather than reproduced, existing ballads. It was followed by other works like William Shield's Rosina (1781). Although the form declined in popularity towards the end of the eighteenth century, it was maintained into the nineteenth century by figures such as Charles Dibdin and his family and its influence can be seen in light operas like those of Gilbert and Sullivan's, particularly their early works like The Sorcerer (1877).

== The popularisation of music ==
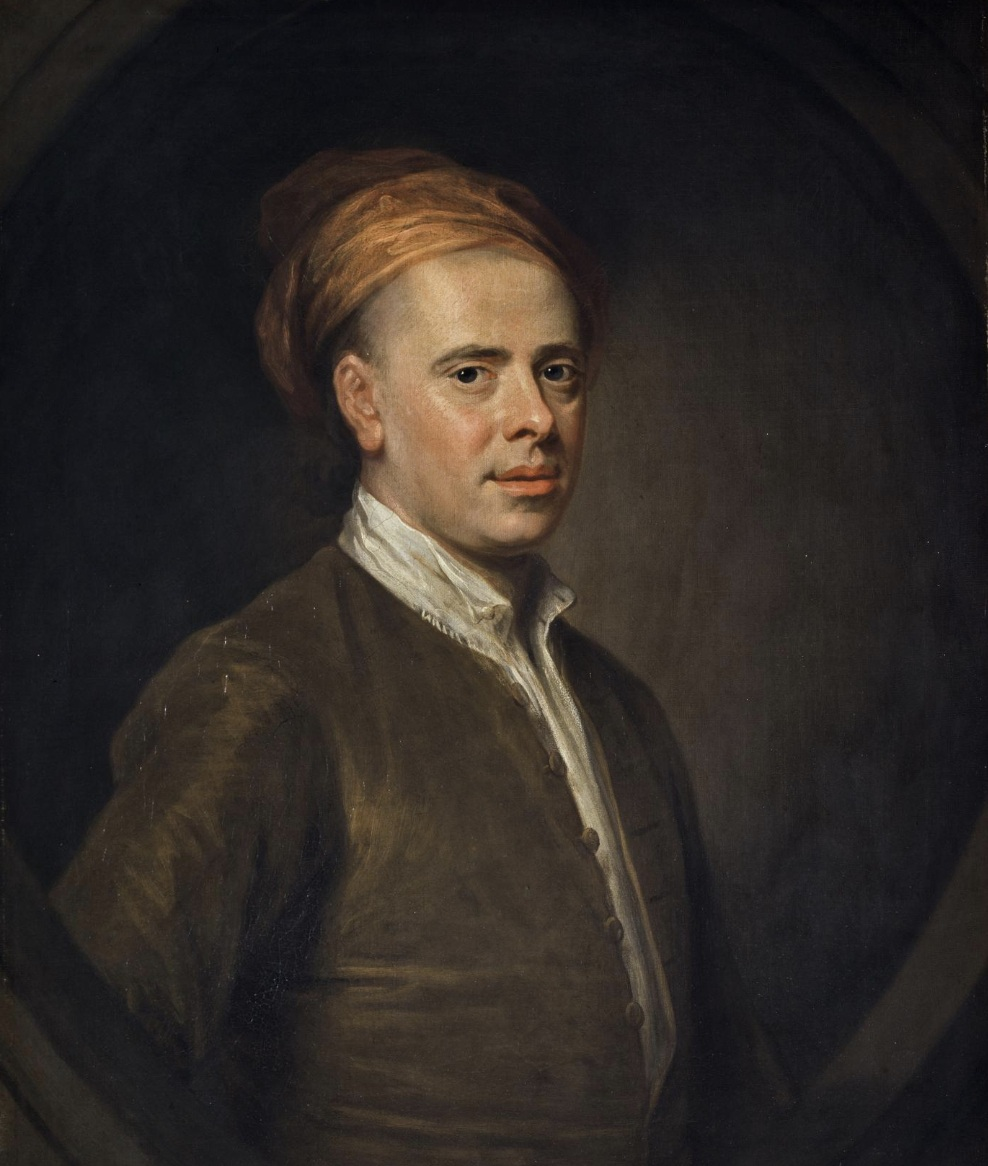
Allan Ramsay, poet and librettist, painted in 1722 by William Aikman

In the eighteenth century the increasing availability of instruments such as the harpsichord, spinet and later the piano, and cheap print meant that works created for opera and the theatre were often published for private performance, with Thomas Arne's (1710–78) song "Rule Britannia" (1740) probably the best-known. From the 1730s elegant concert halls began to be built across the country and attendance rivalled that of the theatre, facilitating visits by figures such as Haydn, J. C. Bach and the young Mozart. The Italian style of classical music was probably first brought to Scotland by the Italian cellist and composer Lorenzo Bocchi, who travelled to Scotland in the 1720s, introducing the cello to the country and then developing settings for lowland Scots songs. He possibly had a hand in the first Scottish Opera, the pastoral The Gentle Shepherd, with libretto by the makar Allan Ramsay. The extension of interest in music can be seen in the volume of musical publication, festivals, and the foundation of over 100 choral societies across the country. George III (reigned 1760–1820), and the aristocracy in general, continued to be patrons of music through the foundation of organisations like the Royal Concert of Music in 1776 and events like the Handel Festival from 1784. Outside of court patronage there were also a number of major figures, including the Scottish composer Thomas Erskine, 6th Earl of Kellie (1732–81) well known in his era, but whose work was quickly forgotten after his death and has only just begun to be reappraised.
