= Voluntary (music) =

Form of music, usually for an organ

Incipit of "Voluntary I" by George Frideric Handel.

A voluntary is a piece of music closely associated with the Anglican church. Voluntaries could be performed before and after the service and occasionally during it. The works are commonly improvised.

The earliest known voluntary is found in The Mulliner Book (c. 1545–70) and is composed by Richard Alwood. Until the late 17th century, voluntary was used interchangeably with "verse" and "fancy" or "fantasia" to describe a fugal piece. The names also could imply an improvised piece, and they were primarily associated with the organ.

In the early 17th century, the double voluntary developed where the fugal subjects are typically introduced on the Chair organ. The left hand might introduce another subject on the Great manual, and eventually both hands would play on the Great. The first known example of the double voluntary was composed by Orlando Gibbons. The form flourished after the Stuart Restoration.

According to Anglican divine James Clifford (1622–1698), a voluntary would normally be played on the organ after the Psalms and before the first lesson of the morning and evening prayer services. One voluntary on the "Old 100th" has been attributed to either John Blow or his pupil Henry Purcell, who both served as Westminster Abbey's organist. Arthur Bedford reckoned Blow as "the greatest Master in the World, for playing most gravely and seriously in his Voluntaries..."

In 1673, Matthew Locke wrote several voluntaries which featured an introduction followed by a fugal allegro. This was the basic model for the English voluntary for the next century. The voluntary was the only indigenous solo keyboard form of the 18th century in England.

The liturgical focus of the voluntary waned in the 18th century. While the chorale prelude remained a vital form of church music in Europe, English composers began to focus on the fugue and voluntary as the main focus of secular organ music. John Marsh (1752–1828) was a prolific voluntary composer who also wrote lengthy explanatory notes and a method book on the genre. Marsh prescribes George Frideric Handel's oratorio themes as suitable voluntary subjects throughout the liturgical year because the listener's familiarity with the material will provoke an appropriate reaction. Other notable voluntary composers include William Boyce, John Stanley, and Thomas Arne.

Many organists and other musicians of high prominence published collections of voluntaries - usually ten or twelve -'for organ or harpsichord', establishing the genre as a serious addition to the standard repertoire. Whilst almost always the harpsichord is indicated alongside the organ, subsequent markings which frequently appear in the music, such as swell or eccho suggest the organ was the chief instrument in mind.

The form typically begins with a short slow movement followed by a contrasting more substantial fast movement, either a fugue or movement for a solo stop on the organ. Two movements are very common although three and four are also encountered. Some imitate the character of the French overture, with a slow movement of dotted or double-dotted rhythms, followed by a fugue. Others begin with a slow movement making use of close-written harmony and suspensions, followed by solo writing for the right hand and one-line accompaniment for the left hand, such as the trumpet voluntary or the cornet voluntary. In the latter the eccho manual and/or the swell or full organ to give ripieno effects are often employed, and it is typically non-fugal. At the time, organ builders such as Renatus Harris had been building organs with stops imitating certain instruments such as the trumpet and cornett. Some composers, such as John Bennett (ca. 1735–1784) made more use of the slow introduction than, say, John Stanley whose introductory movements tend to be shorter and simpler in comparison. In Bennett's case, the introductions can easily stand alone as movements in their own right. With most composers, the slow introductory movement sometimes ends with an imperfect cadence inevitably leading into the next movement. Others finish with a perfect cadence. Many of the fast movements end with a short adagio section, particularly those of William Goodwin, John Bennett and, to a lesser extent, William Boyce.

One noteworthy example of a substantial voluntary is that of Johann Christoph Pepusch, which has 12 movements demonstrating the range of the genre. Several of the movements are named after organ solo stops or mixtures (bassoon, cornet, trumpet, sesquialtera, flute, twelfth, etc.). Pepusch had been the teacher of Bennett and other younger composers.

The English organ voluntary of the 18th century does not have the devotional flavoured of the chorale prelude of Johann Sebastian Bach, who had died in 1750. The new galant style emphasized lighter elegance. The writing can be clichéd, based on rapid scales, arpeggios and sequences which sometimes can be perceived as superficial and repetitive. Variation between the style of one composer and the next is sometimes not greatly obvious. However, the very best still represent originality and exploit fully the possibilities of the instruments of the time. Of the many composers active in London, those of Maurice Greene, William Goodwin and John Bennett arguably show the most inventiveness and variety in character. The voluntaries of John Bennett demonstrate the greatest variety of textures and profundity of character.

English lawyer and amateur musician Roger North (1653–1734) wrote, "Voluntary upon an Organ is the consummate office of a musitian". North argued that the voluntary was proprium quarto modo, a form that belonged to all musicians of any level. In William Makepeace Thackeray's 1848 novel Vanity Fair, Becky Sharp triumphantly plays a voluntary for herself after manipulating another man.

== See also ==
- Trumpet Voluntary
- Fantasia (music)
- Fugue
