= Jonathan Battishill =

English composer, keyboardist and singer (1738–1801)

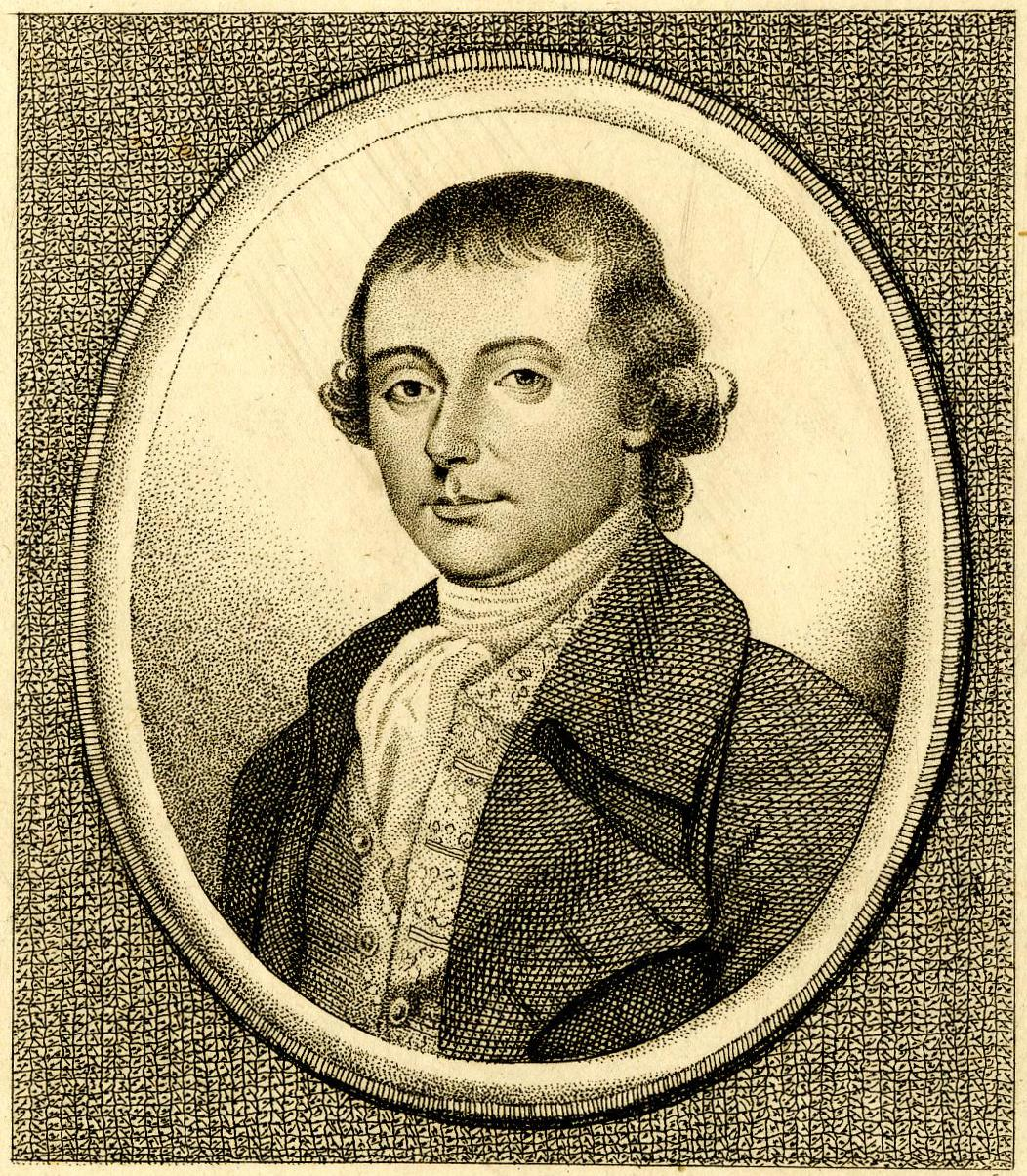
Portrait print of Jonathan Battishill

Jonathan Battishill (May 1738 – 10 December 1801) was an English composer, keyboard player, and concert tenor. He began his career as a composer writing theatre music but later devoted himself to working as an organist and composer for the Church of England. He is considered one of the outstanding 18th century English composers of church music and is best remembered today for his seven-part anthem Call to Remembrance, which has long survived in the repertoires of cathedral choirs.

== Biography ==
Battishill was born in London. Beginning at the age of nine, he sang as a chorister at St. Paul's Cathedral initially under the direction of composer Charles King. After his voice broke he studied organ, music composition, and singing under William Savage, almoner and master of the choristers. He became a highly skilled organist and was particularly talented at extempore playing; a skill that soon attracted attention and led to his appointment as William Boyce's deputy at the Chapel Royal.

During the mid-1750s he began appearing as a tenor soloist in London concerts. One of his earliest engagements was on 16 March 1756 in a concert of Handel's Alexander's Feast at the Great Room, Dean Street, where he was described as 'Mr Batichel'. That same year he became the conductor and harpsichordist at the Covent Garden Theatre. While there he composed incidental songs and choruses for plays and pantomime music for both Covent Garden and the Theatre Royal, Drury Lane. In 1758 he became a member of the Madrigal Society and in 1761 a member of the Royal Society of Musicians. He was also a 'priviledged member' [sic] of the Noblemen and Gentlemen's Catch Club from c1762, but lost his membership twice for not attending meetings. In 1771 his glee Come bind my hair, ye wood nymphs fair won the club's gold medal.

In 1764 Battishill was appointed organist of St Clement Eastcheap, which had recently united with the parish at St Martin Orgar. Three years later he became organist at Christ Church, Newgate Street as well and served at both St Clement and Christ Church until his death in 1801. During this time he periodically gave organ concerts and he particularly became known for his performances of Handel's keyboard works. He also would still occasionally perform in concerts as a singer. He possessed an exceptional memory which was displayed in one concert where he played and sang from memory several airs from Samuel Arnold's oratorio The Prodigal Son without the sheet music, and after not hearing the work for more than 20 years.

While working at Covent Garden, Battishill met singing actress Elizabeth Davies who had originated the role of Margery in Thomas Arne's Love in a Village. The two became romantically involved and on 19 December 1765 they married. However the marriage was unsuccessful, and Elizabeth had a publicly known affair with actor Anthony Webster, with whom she eventually moved to Ireland in 1776. Elizabeth died in Cork in October 1777. Battishill also had an affair with a woman who called herself Ann Battishill at the time of his death. They apparently lived together from about 1775 until the end of Battishill's life. Although Battishill was involved with another woman, his wife's desertion caused a deep depression from which he never recovered. He declined into alcoholism and his compositional output became minimal for the rest of his life. His alcoholism also resulted in his not being appointed organist of St Paul's on the death of John Jones in 1796.

From 1777 on Battishill devoted himself mainly to his book collection. From the time he was a boy he was an avid reader, and throughout his life he had collected some 6000 to 7000 volumes in his personal library. He was mostly interested in theological works and the works of classical authors. In 1801 Battishill was buried in St Paul's near the grave of William Boyce in keeping with his own wishes.

== Works ==
Most of Battishill's compositions date from the period 1760–1775, and reflect his diverse employments during this time. He began his career primarily as a composer of theatre music; writing mostly incidental music for plays. He composed the music for one pantomime, The Rites of Hecate, which used a text by poet James Love. It premiered at Drury Lane on 26 December 1763. He also notably co-composed the music to the three-act opera Almena with Michael Arne, the son of Thomas Arne, which premiered in 1764 at Drury Lane. The opera was a theatrical failure, but critics of the day attributed its lack of success to dramatic faults on the part of the librettist Rolt, rather than to problems with the music. He also wrote several songs for London's pleasure gardens, of which Kate of Aberdeen is probably his best known.

Upon taking his first organist post in 1764, Battishill composed chiefly church music, glees, catches, madrigals, and part-songs. He was particularly prolific in his output of Anglican chant (used for the psalms and canticles), hymns, and anthems. His anthems are considered his most exemplary work and are admired for employing rich blends in a multi-voiced arrangement. His anthems included O Lord, Look Down from Heaven and Call to Remembrance, the latter of which was sung at his own funeral and is still performed in cathedrals today. Of his glees, I Loved Thee Beautiful and Kind is probably his best known work. His chants also remain in use.

== Sources ==
- Maitland, John Alexander Fuller (1885). "Battishill, Jonathan" . In Stephen, Leslie (ed.). Dictionary of National Biography. Vol. 3. London: Smith, Elder & Co.
- J. A. F. Maitland, rev. David J. Golby (2004). "Battishill, Jonathan (1738–1801)". Oxford Dictionary of National Biography. Oxford Dictionary of National Biography (online ed.). Oxford University Press. doi:10.1093/ref:odnb/1717. (Subscription, Wikipedia Library access or UK public library membership required.)
