= Loosemore =

Loosemore is a surname. Notable people with the surname include:

- Arnold Loosemore (1896–1924), English recipient of the Victoria Cross
- George Loosemore (1619–1682), English organist (brother of Henry and John)
- Henry Loosemore (d. 1670), English organist
- John Loosemore (1616–1681), English builder of pipe organs
- Sarah Loosemore (born 1971), Welsh tennis player
