= Francis Piggott =

Francis Piggott or Pigott may refer to:

- Sir Francis Taylor Piggott (1852–1925), British judge and author
- Francis Pigott Stainsby Conant (1809–1863), British politician
- Francis Pigott (composer) (c. 1665–1704), English Baroque composer and organist
- Francis Joseph Pigott (1865–1939), British engineer
