= I was glad =

British choral works

Hubert Parry: "I was glad" (1902)
Parry's anthem, written for the coronation of King Edward VII in 1902.

'I was glad' (Latin incipit: Laetatus sum) is an English text drawn from selected verses of Psalm 122. It has been used at Westminster Abbey in the coronation ceremonies of British monarchs since those of King Charles I in 1626.

== Text ==
The text accompanies the monarch's entrance into Westminster Abbey and was formalised in the 1662 Book of Common Prayer.

1. I was glad when they said unto me : We will go into the house of the Lord.
2. Our feet shall stand in thy gates : O Jerusalem.
3. Jerusalem is built as a city : that is at unity in itself.
4. For thither the tribes go up, even the tribes of the Lord : to testify unto Israel, to give thanks unto the Name of the Lord.
5. For there is the seat of judgement : even the seat of the house of David.
6. O pray for the peace of Jerusalem : they shall prosper that love thee.
7. Peace be within thy walls : and plenteousness within thy palaces.
8. For my brethren and companions' sakes : I will wish thee prosperity.
9. Yea, because of the house of the Lord our God : I will seek to do thee good.

The selected verses (verses 4, 5, 8 and 9 are omitted) form a prayer for the peace and prosperity of Jerusalem, and its use in the coronation service clearly draws a parallel between Jerusalem and the United Kingdom.

=== 'Vivat" interpolation ===
Since the coronation of King James II in 1685 an additional non-biblical text is added to the psalm verses used in the Westminster Abbey ceremonies, i.e. the acclamation "Vivat Rex ... " or "Vivat Regina ... " ("Long live King/Queen ..."). By tradition this acclamation is made by King's or Queen's Scholars of Westminster School as the Sovereign passes through the Quire of Westminster Abbey.

=== "Vivat" pronunciation ===
The acclamation uses a variant of standard Latin pronunciation known as Anglicised Latin. Scholars of Classical Latin would pronounce the Vivat Regina as [ˈwiːwat reːˈɡiːna]; those of Ecclesiastical Latin would pronounce it [ˈvivat reˈdʒina]. The traditional English pronunciation when referring to the British monarch is /ˈvaɪvæt rɪˈdʒaɪnə/ VY-vat rij-EYE-nə. At the coronation of both a king and a queen, the vivat for the queen precedes that for the king.

== Musical settings at British coronations ==
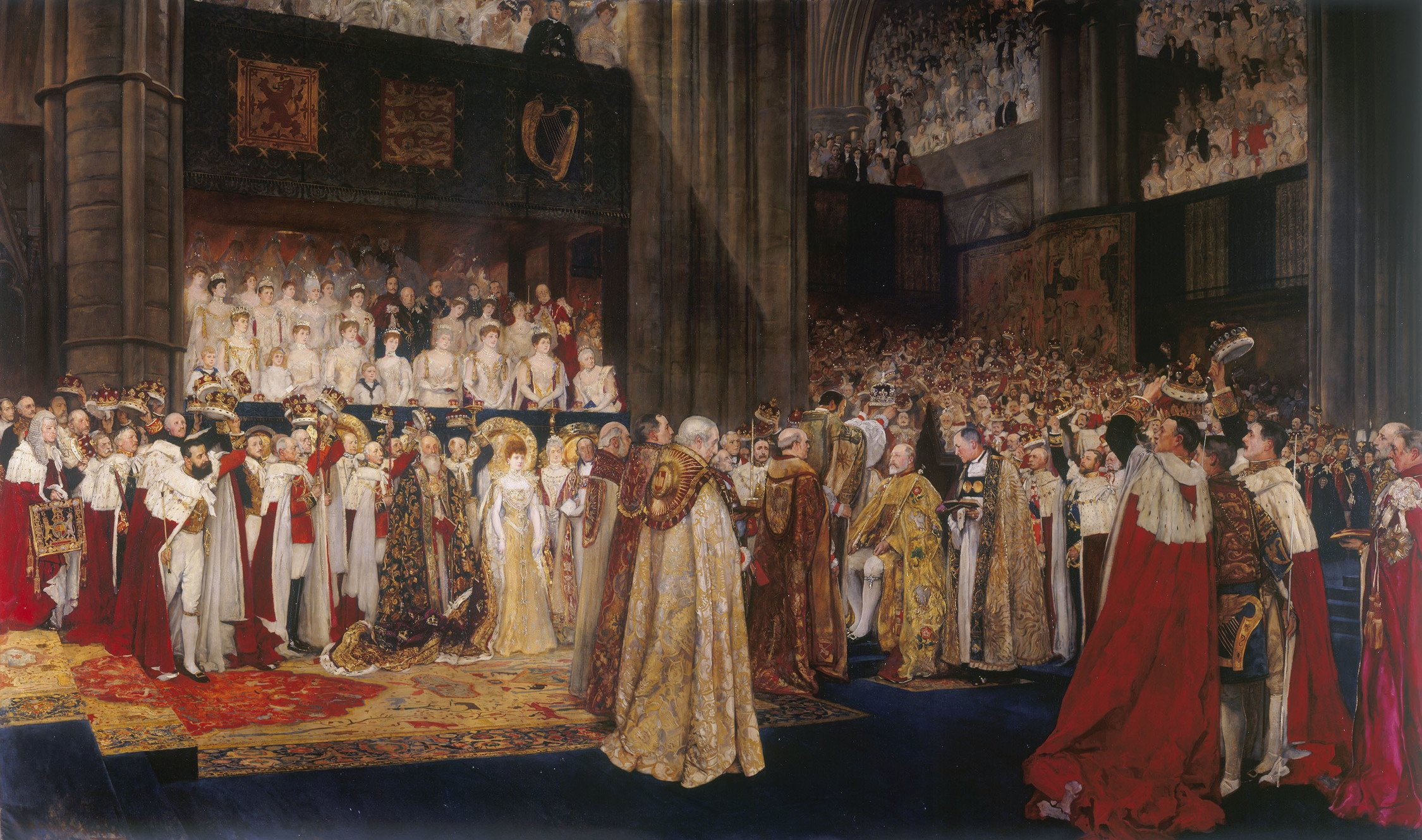
Parry's setting was written for the coronation of King Edward VII in 1902

- 1626: King Charles I, no details
- 1661: King Charles II, William Child and Thomas Tomkins
- 1685: King James II, Henry Purcell and John Blow

=== Pigott ===
- 1702: Queen Anne, Francis Pigott
- 1714: King George I, Francis Pigott
- 1727: King George II, Francis Pigott

=== Boyce ===
- 1761: King George III, William Boyce

=== Attwood ===
- 1821: King George IV, Thomas Attwood
- 1831: King William IV, Thomas Attwood
- 1838: Queen Victoria, Thomas Attwood

=== Parry ===
Different versions of Vivat acclamations

- 1902: King Edward VII, Hubert Parry
  - Parry indicated in the score a space for an improvisatory fanfare between the King's and the Queen's "Vivat" acclamations
  - At the first performance of Parry's setting at the 1902 coronation the director of music Sir Frederick Bridge misjudged the timing and had finished the anthem before the King had arrived, having to repeat it when the right moment came. Bridge was saved by the organist, Walter Alcock, who improvised in the interim.
- 1911: King George V, Hubert Parry
  - Parry revised his 1902 version by adding an introduction, antiphonal choir effects and brass fanfares
- 1937: King George VI and Queen Elizabeth, Hubert Parry
  - At the coronation of George VI and Elizabeth in 1937, the acclamation took the form of "Vivat Regina Elizabetha" and "Vivat Rex Georgius".
- 1953: Queen Elizabeth II, Hubert Parry
  - At the coronation of Elizabeth II in 1953, the acclamation took the form of "Vivat Regina Elizabetha"
- 2023: King Charles III and Queen Camilla, Hubert Parry
  - At the coronation of Charles III and Camilla in 2023 the acclamation took the form of "Vivat Regina Camilla!" and "Vivat Rex Carolus!"

== Use at other British royal events ==
Setting by Hubert Parry:

- 1945: National service of thanksgiving for VE Day at St Paul's Cathedral
- 1977: Silver Jubilee of Elizabeth II, national service of thanksgiving at St Paul's Cathedral
- 1981: Wedding of Prince Charles and Lady Diana Spencer at St Paul's Cathedral
- 2002: Golden Jubilee of Elizabeth II, national service of thanksgiving at St Paul's Cathedral
- 2011: Wedding of Prince William and Catherine Middleton at Westminster Abbey.
- 2022: Platinum Jubilee of Elizabeth II, national service of thanksgiving at St Paul's Cathedral

Henry Purcell: "I was glad" (1685)
Anthem for the Coronation of James II (1685)

== Other complete or partial settings in English ==
- (n.d.): Richard Woodward
- (n.d.): Leo Sowerby
- 1879: John Goss
- 1902: Henry Marcellus Higgs.
  - This setting was distributed by the Church of England in an order of service for that year's Coronation Day to be used in its churches throughout His Majesty's Empire.
- 1933: Herbert Howells.
- 1955: S. Drummond Wolff
- 1957: Robin Orr
- 1962: Healey Willan
- 1971: Peter Hallock

== See also ==
- Laetare Sunday, which uses a similar introit
- Other settings of Psalm 122 in various languages.
