= Trumpet voluntary =

Type of Baroque keyboard piece

John Stanley's Trumpet Voluntary
2m 48s

A trumpet voluntary is a voluntary – a musical composition for the organ – played using the trumpet stop. Trumpet voluntaries are associated with the English Baroque era and usually consist of a slow introduction followed by a faster section with the right hand playing fanfare-like figures over a simple accompaniment in the left hand. In some instances, the trumpet stop is replaced by the cornet or a flute stop. Echo effects are also sometimes used.

Prince of Denmark's March
Arrangement for trumpet, string orchestra and organ by Henry Wood

The best-known trumpet voluntary is the Prince of Denmark's March, a composition by Jeremiah Clarke written circa. 1700. It is properly a rondo for keyboard and was not originally called a trumpet voluntary. It is very popular as wedding music and was played at the 1981 wedding of Charles, Prince of Wales, and Lady Diana Spencer. This piece, particularly in a well-known arrangement for trumpet, string orchestra and organ by Sir Henry Wood, was incorrectly attributed for years to Henry Purcell. It is now known to have been the work of Clarke.

The organist and composer John Stanley also wrote several trumpet voluntaries, as did Clarke's teacher John Blow.

== Free scores ==
- IMSLP Twelve Voluntaries for the Organ or Harpsichord. Selected from the Works of several Eminent Authors. Ca 1780. (Anonymous composers, except no. 3 by John Stanley)
- IMSLP Collection of Voluntaries for Organ or Harpsichord, composed by Dr. Green, Mr. Travers and several other eminent Masters (1765).
- John Beckwith 6 Voluntaries for the Organ or Harpsichord (1780).
- Thomas Sanders Dupuis Voluntary in C.
- William Goodwin Twelve Voluntaries for the Organ or Harpsichord (1776).
- Maurice Greene Twelve Voluntaries for the Organ or Harpsichord (1779).
- William Russell 24 Voluntaries for the Organ or Pianoforte, in two vol. (1804 ?, 1812).
- John Stanley 30 Voluntaries for Organ or Harpsichord, Op. 5, Op. 6 & Op. 7.
- John Travers Voluntary XI from XII Voluntaries for the Organ or Harpsichord (ca 1769).
