= Henry Cooke (composer) =

English composer, choirmaster and singer

Henry Cooke (c. 1616 – 13 July 1672) commonly known as Captain Cooke, was an English composer, choirmaster and singer. He was a boy chorister in the Chapel Royal and by the outbreak of the English Civil War was a Gentleman of the Chapel Royal. He joined the Royalist cause, in the service of which he rose to the rank of captain. With the Restoration of Charles II he returned to the Chapel Royal as Master of the Children and was responsible for the rebuilding of the chapel and the introduction of instrumental music into the services. The choristers in his charge included his successor and eventual son-in-law Pelham Humfrey, as well as Henry Purcell, John Blow, William Turner, Robert Smith and Michael Wise.

On reconstituting the choir of the Chapel Royal, Dussuaze states:

A year after the opening of his Majesty's Chapel, the orderers of the music were "necessitated to supply superior parts of the music with cornets and men's feigned voices, there being not one lad for all that time capable of singing his part readily." The conditions soon became better under Cooke's management. On 23 February 1660, Pepys mentions Cooke and his boy, apparently Pelham Humfrey, whom he heard make a trial of an anthem for the following day. By November, 1663, the first set was properly trained, and Cooke had already obtained remarkable results. On the 22nd Humfrey's first anthem, "Have Mercy upon Me, O God," was sung in his Majesty's Chapel, and Pepys remarks: "They say there are four or five of them that can do so much"; the other four being probably Smith, John Blow, Michael Wise and Tudway or Turner.

— Captain Cooke and his choir-boys, 1911

Cooke was one of the five English composers who created music for Sir William Davenant's The Siege of Rhodes (1656), often called the first English opera.

Cultural offices
Preceded by Thomas Day	Master of the Children of the Chapel Royal; 1660-1672	Succeeded by Pelham Humfrey
