= Charles King (composer) =

English composer and musician

Charles King (1687 – 17 March 1748) was an English composer and musician of the 17th and 18th centuries, who at one time held the post of Almoner and Master of Choristers for St. Paul's Cathedral under John Blow and Jeremiah Clarke.

== Biography ==
Owing to the death of Jeremiah Clarke, Charles King was designated as the serviceable man by Dr. Thomas A. Greene, the Vicar of St. Paul's Cathedral, appointed him Almoner and Master of the Choristers in 1707.

The boys all moved to a house in the parish of St Benet until his death in 1748.

Some of his choristers included English composers Jonathan Battishill, William Boyce and organist Dr. Maurice Greene.

Charles King died in 1748 whilst holding the post at St. Paul's Cathedral.

== List of works ==
- Alexander's Feast (c. 1730)
- Canticles
- I will always give thanks (Sacred Music for One, Two, Three and Four Voices arr. by R.J.S. Stevens, London, for the Editor, 1803
- now appears in Anthems for Choirs 2 (Twenty-four Anthems for Sopranos & Altos edited by Philip Ledger), Published by Oxford University Press
- Magnificat in F
- Nunc Dimittis in F
- Songs of Praise the Angels Sang - hymn
- Te Deum in D
- O Absalon My Son - Catch/round a 3 voc

Cultural offices
Preceded by Jeremiah Clarke	Almoner and Master of the Choristers of St Paul's Cathedral; 1707-1748	Succeeded by William Savage
