= Burial Service =

A burial service is part of the rites performed at many funerals.

Burial Service may also refer to:

- Burial Service, music published by William Croft in 1724
- “Burial Service”, a 1936 episode of the American radio show Lights Out
- The Burial Service, sacred music by Renaissance composer Thomas Morley
