= Richard Brind =

English organist and minor composer

- Born: c. 1670s or 1680s England
- Died: March 1718; London, England
- Genres: Classical
- Occupation(s): Organist, Composer
- Instrument: Organ

Richard Brind (died March 1718) was an English organist and minor composer of the 17th century.

== Biography ==
Born in England in the 1670s or 1680s, Brind was a chorister at St Paul's Cathedral as boy and young teenager. While there, he sang under the directorship of John Blow and Jeremiah Clarke. After Clarke's death in 1707, he was appointed vicar-choral and, while not succeeding him as Master of the Choristers, he did take over his post as organist at St Paul's. According to music historian Sir John Hawkins, Brind was "no very celebrated performer", and, although five anthems are listed in Divine Harmony (London, 1712), none of his compositions survives. He died in London, and is best remembered today as a teacher to composer Maurice Greene.

Cultural offices
Preceded by Jeremiah Clarke	Organist and Master of the Choristers of St Paul's Cathedral; 1707 - 1718	Succeeded by Maurice Greene
