= George Loosemore =

English organist and composer

George Loosemore (12 September 1619 – 11 September 1682) was an English organist and composer who became organist of Trinity College, Cambridge, in 1660 and of St John's College, Cambridge, in 1661, serving in both roles until his death.

== Life ==
Baptised at Barnstaple, Devonshire, Loosemore was the son of the organ builder Samuel Loosemore. His brothers included John, also an organ builder, and Henry, a fellow organist.

Loosemore was appointed organist at Trinity College, Cambridge, in 1660 and at St John's College, Cambridge, the following year. He may also have succeeded his brother Henry as resident organist and teacher of music at Kirtling, Cambridgeshire, under the patronage of Dudley North, 4th Baron North.

He died in Cambridge.

== Works ==
Surviving works include the anthem Glory be to God in the collection of music compiled by Thomas Tudway.
