= Jane Savage =

English harpsichordist and composer

Jane Savage (born 1752/1753, died 1824) was an English harpsichordist and composer. She was the daughter of English musician and composer William Savage (c. 1720–1789) and his wife Mary Bolt Savage. It is likely that Jane Savage accompanied her father from his estate near Tenterden in Kent to London in 1780 or 1781 and lived in Red Lion Square, Holborn. Most of her music was published in this period. Her output was mainly vocal or keyboard works, described as "drawing-room pieces". No modern edition of her works exists.

Her unpublished pieces have predominantly been lost. In 2020, Hymn for Christmas Day, an anthem setting the text "While shepherds watched their flocks by night", composed in around 1785 and performed by the Asylum for Female Orphans in London, was rediscovered and published by the Church Music Society. It is the earliest known example of an anthem for the Church of England to have been written by a female composer.

After her father and mother died, Savage married merchant R. Rolleston in about 1790. It is unclear whether she continued her career in music. She did not publish any compositions in her married name.

== Works ==
Selected works include:

- Six Sonatas for Harpsichord or Piano (1783)
- Six Rondos for the Harpsichord or Pianoforte, Opus 3 (1786)
- Strephan and Flavia, A Favourite Cantata (voice and keyboard instrument) (1786)
- A Favourite Duet (keyboard) (1789)
- Two Duets for Voices (1789)
- God Save the King, adapted as a Double Lesson (keyboard) (1789)
