= Pelham Humfrey =

English composer (1647–1674)

Pelham Humfrey (Humphrey, Humphrys) (1647 in London – 14 July 1674 in Windsor) was an English composer. He was the first of the new generation of English composers at the beginning of the Restoration to rise to prominence.

== Life and career ==
Pelham Humfrey was born in 1647. By the age of seventeen Humfrey's anthems were evidently in use and he was sent by the King to study in Paris, probably in January 1665 where he was greatly influenced by music at the French Court. On the basis of the music he wrote on his return, he also assimilated the more expressive vocal style of Carissimi. He later succeeded Henry Cooke (his father-in-law) as Master of the Children of the Chapel Royal and also became composer to the Court.

Humfrey died at the age of 26, but along with Matthew Locke exerted a strong influence on his peers even at his young age, including William Turner, Henry Purcell, and John Blow. At his early death he had already produced several works of great poignancy and expressive power including the Verse Anthem O Lord my God.

Samuel Pepys mentions Humfrey's dress sense and general demeanour in his diary:

Little Pelham Humphreys is an absolute monsieur as full of form and confidence and vanity, and disparages everybody's skill but his own. The truth is, every body says he is very able, but to hear how he laughs at all the King's musick here, as Blagrave and others, that they cannot keep time nor tune, nor understand anything; and that Grebus, the Frenchman, the King's master of the musick, how he understands nothing, nor can play on any instrument, and so cannot compose: and that he will give him a lift out of his place; and that he and the King are mighty great! and that he hath already spoke to the King of Grebus would make a man piss.

One of Humfrey's best-known compositions is his setting of the poem "A Hymn to God the Father", by John Donne.

Humfrey died on 14 July 1674, at around age 27.

Cultural offices
Preceded by Henry Cooke	Master of the Children of the Chapel Royal; 1672–1674	Succeeded by John Blow
