= Richard Browne (d. 1710) =

English composer and organist

Richard Browne (died May 1710) was an English composer and organist. He is not to be confused with two other English composers of the same name, Richard Browne (fl 1614–1629) and Richard Browne (c.1630–1664).

== Life and career ==
The earliest potential record of Richard Browne is as a violinist in the court of Charles II of England between 1670 and 1674. However, scholars speculate that this may be a different man. The definitive record is in 1686 when Browne became organist of St Lawrence Jewry; a position he held until his death in May 1710. He concurrently served as the music master at Christ's Hospital, a boys school in Horsham, West Sussex, from March 1688 until his dismissal from that post in 1697 due to his use of bad language to the children. He also worked as organist at Saint Mary at Lambeth from 1701 until his death.

As a composer, Browne is best known for his songs and catches; often utilizing his own lyrics. His more well known catches were mostly written for three voices; including Come, boy, light a faggot (The Drawer’s Catch), Peter White that never goes right (A Catch on a Man with a Wry Nose), I, Thomas of Bedford (The Bedford Catch), The duke sounds to horse boys (A Catch on the Duke of Marlborough’s Victory over the French) and Ah sorry poor Frenchman (A Catch on the Modern Courage and Conduct of the French). Also popular, was War begets poverty (The Almanack Catch), for four voices. Most of his catches and songs have been published in song collections; including works in Henry Playford's Vinculum societatis (1687) and The Second Book of the Pleasant Musical Companion (1701) among other 17th and 18th century anthologies. For the choir at Christ’s Hospital he composed eight innovative Easter Psalms using contemporary verse anthems. In 1707 he composed the elegy Weep all ye Swains in honor of Jeremiah Clarke.

Richard Browne was buried on May 21, 1710.
