= The Self Banished =

Poem written by Edmund Waller

"The Self Banished" is a poem written by Edmund Waller in about 1645. It was set to music by the baroque composer John Blow in 1700.

It is also one of the first songs written by the English composer Edward Elgar. Composed in 1875, specifically for "soprano or tenor", it was unpublished until recently.

== Lyrics ==
Blow set stanzas 1 and 2. Elgar added a stanza beginning with his own spelling of "Absence".

THE SELF-BANISHED

It is not that I love you less

Than when before your feet I lay:

But to prevent the sad increase

Of hopeless love, I keep away.

In vain! (alas!) for ev'ry thing

Which I have known belong to you,

Your form does to my fancy bring,

And makes my old wounds bleed anew.

Who in the Spring from the new Sun

Already has a fever got,

Too late begins those shafts to shun,

Which Phoebus through his veins has shot.

Too late he would the pain assuage,

And to shadows thick he doth retire;

About with him he bears the rage,

And in his tainted blood the fire.

[Abscence is vain for ev'ry thing

That I have known belong to you,

Your form does to my fancy bring,

And makes my old wounds bleed anew.]*

But vow'd I have, and never must

Your banish'd servant trouble you;

For if I break, you may distrust

The vow I made to love you, too.

== Recordings ==
- Elgar: Complete Songs for Voice & Piano Amanda Roocroft (soprano), Reinild Mees (piano)
