= Hearken Unto Me Ye Holy Children =

Anthem by Maurice Greene

"Hearken Unto Me, Ye Holy Children" is an anthem composed by Maurice Greene in 1728. The first performance was probably given on 1 March 1728 at the King's College Chapel, Cambridge; however there is some conjecture that the actual first performance date was 25 April 1728 (to coincide with King George II's visit).

A typical performance takes about 17 minutes.

== Voices ==
- Countertenor
- Tenor
- Bass
- Chorus

== Movements ==
The work has the following movements:

Movement	Type	Voice	Text	Source
1	Solo	Countertenor	Hearken unto me, ye holy children: bud forth as a rose growing by the brooks of the field. Give a sweet savour as frankincense, and flourish as the lilies. Sing a song of praise, bless the Lord in all His works.	Sirach 39, 13-14
2	Chorus		Magnify His name, and shew forth His praise with the songs of your lips and with harps.	Sirach 39, 15
3	Chorus		And in praising Him you shall say: blessed be the Lord God of our fathers, who hath put such a thing into the king's heart; to build this house and set up a holy temple to the Lord, which was prepar'd for everlasting glory.	Sirach 39, 15; Ezra 7, 27; Sirach 49, 12
4	Solo	Tenor	To be a father to the fatherless; to feed them with the bread of understanding, and give them the waters of wisdom to drink.	Sirach 4, 10; Sirach 15, 3
5	Duet	Countertenor and Tenor	Therefore shall he receive a glorious kingdom and a beautiful crown from the hand of the Lord.	Wisdom of Solomon 5, 16
6	Recitative	Bass	How is he numb'red among the children of God, and his lot is among the saints.	Wisdom of Solomon 5, 5
7	Solo	Bass	His name shall endure for ever; His name shall remain under the sun among the posterities, which shall be blessed through him.	Psalm 72, 17 (Book of Common Prayer)
8	Chorus		Blessed be the Lord God of our fathers, who hath put such a thing into the king's heart; to build this house and set up a holy temple to the Lord, which was prepared for everlasting glory. Hallelujah, Amen.	Ezra 7, 27; Sirach 49, 12
