= Francis Pigott (composer) =

- Born: c. 1665
- Died: 15 May 1704 London
- Genres: Baroque music
- Instrument(s): Organ, harpsichord

Francis Pigott (c. 1665 – 15 May 1704) was an English Baroque composer and organist.

== Career ==
He was a choirboy at the Chapel Royal in London from at least August 1678 to Michaelmas 1683. A record at St John's College, Oxford shows a "Mr Pygott, the organist at St John's" and although there is no other evidence that he was employed there, he may have replaced Bartholemew Isaack who left the college for Dublin in late 1684. Pigott was appointed organist at Magdalen College, Oxford in January 1686 and returned to London to play the Father Smith organ at the Temple Church in 1688. On the death of Henry Purcell in 1695, Pigott received an "extraordinary" appointment as organist at the Chapel Royal, and was finally sworn in as the First Organist on 24 March 1697, after the death of William Child.

== Works ==
Pigott has been tentatively identified as the manuscript copyist known as "London A" by his handwriting and by his known association with Henry Purcell and other notable composers of the time. Pigott also collaborated with John Blow, William Croft and Jeremiah Clarke in the production of A Choice Collection of Ayres for the Harpsicorde (London, 1700). His setting of Abraham Cowley's poem The Separation, appears in a compilation called The Banquet of Musick published in volumes between 1688 and 1692. Pigott's setting of the anthem, I was glad, was sung at the coronation of Queen Anne in 1702; it was also used at the coronation of King George I in 1714 and was probably the setting intended for that of King George II in 1727 but was omitted on the day by mistake.

== Family ==
It is believed that Pigott was the son of Francis Pigott (1614 to 1694), who is mentioned as a musician in the diary of Samuel Pepys, and his wife, Elizabeth née Lawson, who were married in 1664. The younger Francis Pigott married Anne Pelling in 1688; their son, John Pigott, succeeded his father as the organist at the Temple Church in 1704. John's son, another Francis Pigott, was organist at St George's Chapel, Windsor Castle until 1756.

== Scores ==
- Free scores by Francis Pigott (composer) at the International Music Score Library Project (IMSLP)

Cultural offices
Preceded by William Child	First Organist of the Chapel Royal; 1697-1704	Succeeded by William Croft and Jeremiah Clarke
