= William Drake (organ builder) =

William Drake (1943–2014) was the founder of the firm of William Drake, Organ Builder, that manufactures pipe organs in Buckfastleigh, Devon, England. He held a Royal Warrant as organ builder to Queen Elizabeth II.

== Biography ==
Drake was born 1947 in Baltimore, Maryland to an English father and mother of Swiss-American citizenship. Returning to England in 1952 on the death of his father he was educated at Dartington College of Arts where he learned the organ under John Wellingham.

He was inspired to become an organ builder following a visit as a teenager to the exhibition of newly built organs at St Albans International Organ Festival at St Albans Abbey. After completing an apprenticeship in Austria with Rieger Orgelbau he worked with Rudolf Janke in Göttingen. He built a small award-winning organ as his Meisterstuck in the workshop of Patrick Collon in Brussels.

Drake established the firm of William Drake Ltd in 1974 in Buckfastleigh, Devon. The company was part of the John Loosemore Centre for Organ and Early Music - an entity that taught a number of subjects concerning the organ - such as playing of the organ, history, and organ-building. Eventually that program was discontinued, but Drake's organ-building firm continued in the premises.

William Drake Ltd has built new organs and restored instruments in a number of countries, including New Zealand and the United States. For the design of instruments, the firm takes its inspiration from English organs of the 18th and 19th centuries. Organs built by Drake's company are mechanical action instruments and restorations adhere to high standards of historical accuracy.

William Drake died on 11 January 2014, aged 70. Today the business continues under the direction of Geert Noppers and Joost de Boer, who have been members of the staff for many years.

== Selected organs ==
- Restoration of the 1780 Seede organ at the Roman Catholic Chapel at Lulworth Castle, Dorset completed 1986, a project that attracted attention internationally.
- A new organ at Jesus College, Oxford, 1993
- A new organ in eighteenth century manner, within a 1732 case Grosvenor Chapel Mayfair London, completed 1991
- Palace of Westminster St Mary Undercroft crypt chapel, a new instrument 1999
- Lincoln Cathedral completed 2010
- A new instrument in the Peacock Room, Trinity College of Music, Greenwich, London, 2003
- 1818 Ballroom Organ at Buckingham Palace, completed 2003
- 1849 Sutton Organ at Jesus College, Cambridge
- 1857 Robson Organ Queen's University of Belfast, completed 2005
- Gray and Davison organ from the 1851 Great Exhibition in Crystal Palace, now installed at St Anne's Limehouse, restored 2006
- Restoration of the George Dallam/Christian Smith, and later, organ at the church of St Giles in the Fields, London
- A new instrument at Lincoln College, Oxford, 2010
- A new instrument in the OBE Chapel, St Faith's Chapel in the crypt of St Paul's Cathedral London 2012
- 1760 George England organ at Christ's Chapel of God's Gift, Dulwich, restored
- Restoration of the Richard Bridge organ at Christ Church Spitalfields which Drake had planned and worked on since 2000, and was completed posthumously by the firm 2015.
