= Gloria (Handel) =

Composition by George Frideric Handel

- Cantata by G. F. Handel
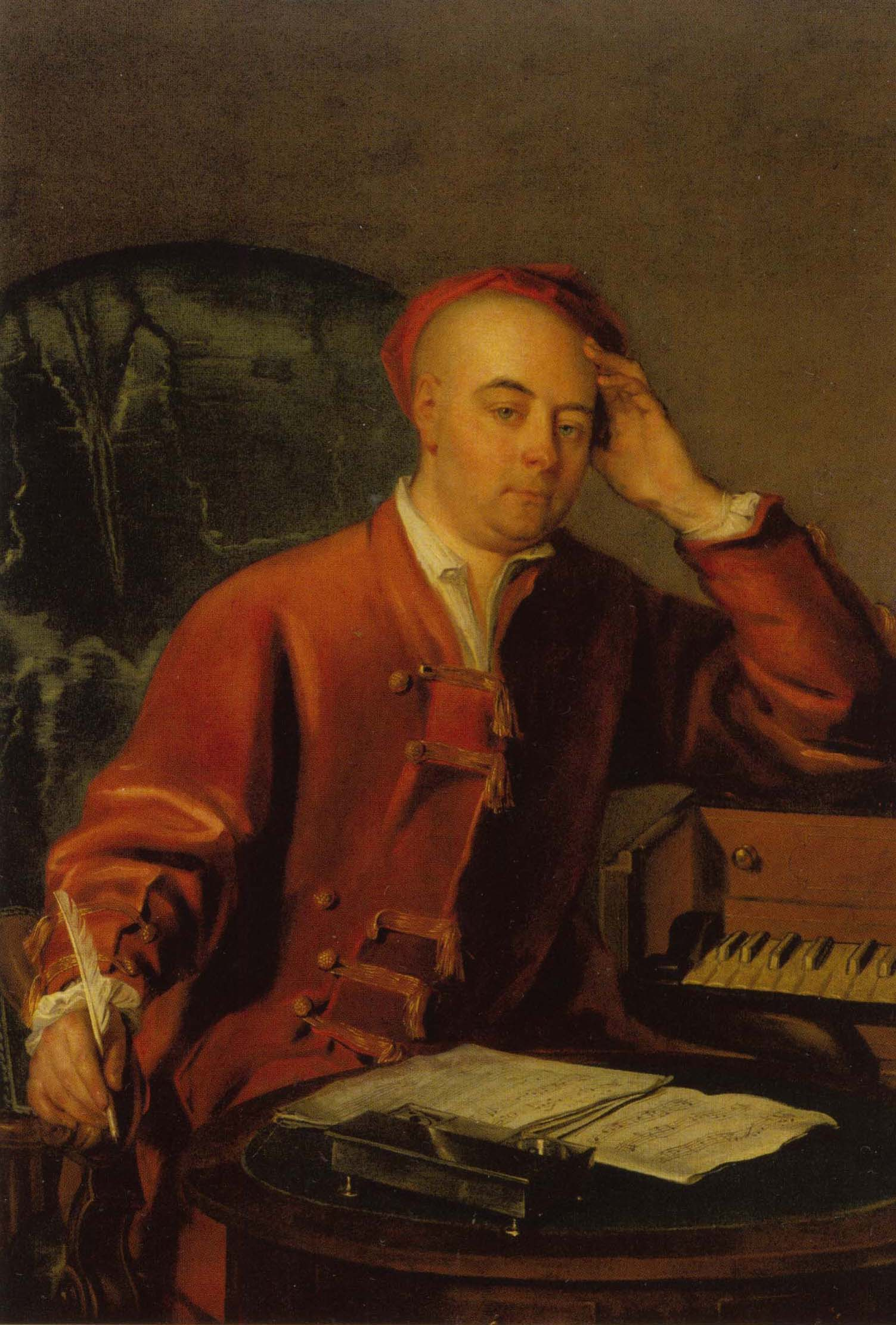
- The composer
- Catalogue: HWV deest
- Year: 1706?
- Period: Baroque
- Form: Sacred solo cantata
- Text: Gloria from the Mass
- Language: Latin
- Movements: 6
- Vocal: soprano solo
- Instrumental: 2 violins; continuo

George Frideric Handel's Gloria is a sacred solo cantata, a setting of the Gloria, the liturgical part of the Mass, for soprano and strings. Handel may have composed it in Germany before departing for Italy in 1706. The composition was lost for many years and was attributed to Handel again only in 2001.

== History ==
Gloria (HWV deest, the Latin word meaning "missing"), is a work which was missing from the Handel thematic catalog, but was discovered at the Royal Academy of Music's library in 2001.

Handel may have composed the Gloria, a demanding piece for a coloratura voice, two violins and basso continuo, during his early years in Germany prior to his departure for Italy in 1706 or in Italy in 1707. He divided the liturgical text into eight movements. Later he used parts of it for his compositions Laudate pueri dominum and Utrecht Jubilate.

The manuscript is not in Handel's hand but bound in a collection of arias by Handel. The singer William Savage (1720-1789) owned the volume. Probably his pupil Robert Stevens left it to the Academy upon his death in 1837. The work was identified by Hans Joachim Marx, professor at the University of Hamburg.

A note in the Sunday Telegraph on 11 March 2001 announced "Lost work by Handel could rival Messiah / An unknown choral work by Handel that some music scholars believe will come to be regarded as significant as Messiah has been discovered in the library of the Royal Academy of Music", but that was a sensational heading, whereas the article described the work correctly. "Perhaps not too many sopranos will be able to perform this piece.", was a comment of Marx, who had found the manuscript. Curtis Price, the principal of the Academy, testified: "The music is fresh, exuberant and a little wild in places, but unmistakably Handel." It was then believed that the piece was written in Italy in 1707. Emma Kirkby, who performed the first recording, released in May 2001, said that "the piece has individuality and charm, good bravura moments, and, more important, some moments of depth, beauty, and poignancy".

The first public performance was on 18 May 2001, sung by soprano Patrizia Kwella with Fiori Musicali and Penelope Rapson as artistic director, at the Hinchingbrooke Performing Arts Centre in Huntingdon. A second performance was given at the International Händel Göttingen Festival on 3 June 2001 by Dominique Labelle with the Philharmonia Baroque Orchestra and Nicholas McGegan. Katia Plaschka performed it in 2003 in the Unionskirche, Idstein, along with Handel's Utrecht Te Deum and Jubilate.

== Structure ==
Handel divided the text in six movements.

1. Gloria in excelsis Deo
2. Et in terra pax
3. Laudamus te
4. Domine Deus, Rex coelestis
5. Qui tollis peccata mundi
6. Quoniam tu solus sanctus

== See also ==
- List of Latin church music by George Frideric Handel
