= William Croft =

English composer and organist (1678–1727)

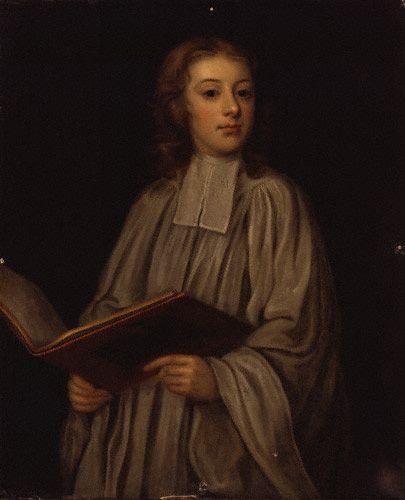
- William Croft as a choirboy, c. 1690.
- Born: Ettington, Warwickshire
- Baptised: 30 December 1678
- Died: 14 August 1727 (aged 48)
- Occupations: Composer and organist
- Organizations: St. Anne's Church, Soho; Chapel Royal; Westminster Abbey

William Croft (baptised 30 December 1678 – 14 August 1727) was an English composer and organist.

== Life ==
Croft was born at the Manor House, Nether Ettington, Warwickshire. He was educated at the Chapel Royal under the instruction of John Blow, and remained there until 1698. Two years after this departure, he became organist of St. Anne's Church, Soho and he became an organist and 'Gentleman extraordinary' at the Chapel Royal. He shared that post with his friend Jeremiah Clarke.

In 1700, Croft, in collaboration with "an Italian Master", probably Gottfried Finger, published six sonatas for violin, flute, harpsichord and viol, in the newly fashionable Italian style.

In 1707, he took over the Master of the Children of the Chapel Royal post, which had been left vacant by the suicide of Jeremiah Clarke. The following year, Croft succeeded Blow (who had lately died) as organist of Westminster Abbey. He composed works for the funeral of Queen Anne (1714) and for the coronation of King George I (1715).

In 1724, Croft published Musica Sacra, a collection of church music, the first such collection to be printed in the form of a score. It contains a Burial Service, which may have been written for Queen Anne or for the Duke of Marlborough. Shortly afterwards his health deteriorated, and he died while visiting Bath aged 48.

A fragment of music attributed to Croft, Ground in C minor (D221), has been used by contemporary composer Michael Nyman as the source of his piece An Eye for an Optical Theory.

=== St Anne ===
One of Croft's most enduring pieces is the hymn tune "St Anne" written to the poem Our God, Our Help in Ages Past by Isaac Watts. Other composers subsequently incorporated the tune in their own works. Handel used it, for instance, in an anthem entitled O Praise the Lord With One Consent, as did Arthur Sullivan in his Festival Te Deum of 1872, and also Hubert Parry in his 1911 Coronation Te Deum. Bach's Fugue in E-flat major, BWV 552, is often called the "St. Anne", due to the similarity (coincidental in this case) of its subject to the hymn melody's first phrase. A further tune attributed to William Croft is 'Binchester' (a village in County Durham) for the hymn 'Happy are they, they that love God'. His tune 'Eatington', for the hymn 'The Church triumphant in thy love' takes its title from Croft's birthplace of Lower Ettington.

=== Funeral sentences ===
Perhaps Croft's most notable legacy is the suite of Funeral Sentences which have been described as a "glorious work of near genius". First published as part of the Burial Service in Musica Sacra, the date and purpose of their composition is uncertain. The seven sentences themselves are from the Book of Common Prayer and are verses from various books of the Bible, intended to be said or sung during an Anglican funeral. One of the sentences, Thou knowest, Lord, the secrets of our hearts, was not composed by Croft, but by Henry Purcell, part of his 1695 Music for the Funeral of Queen Mary. Croft wrote:

"...there is one verse composed by my predecessor, the famous Mr Henry Purcell, to which, in justice to his memory, his name is applied. The reason why I did not compose that verse anew (so as to render the whole service entirely of my own composition) is obvious to every Artist; in the rest of that service composed by me, I have endeavoured as near as I could, to imitate that great master and celebrated composer, whose name will for ever stand high in the rank of those who have laboured to improve the English style..."

Croft's Funeral Sentences were sung at George Frederic Handel's funeral in 1759, and have been included in every British state funeral since their publication. They were used at the funerals of Winston Churchill in 1965, Diana, Princess of Wales in 1997, Queen Elizabeth The Queen Mother in 2002, Baroness Thatcher in 2013, Prince Philip in 2021, and Queen Elizabeth II in 2022.

Cultural offices
Preceded by Francis Pigott	Joint First Organist of the Chapel Royal with Jeremiah Clarke; 1704–1707	Succeeded by William Croft
Preceded by William Croft and Jeremiah Clarke	First Organist of the Chapel Royal; 1707–1727	Succeeded by Maurice Greene
Preceded by John Blow	Organist and Master of the Choristers of Westminster Abbey; 1708–1727	Succeeded by John Robinson
Preceded by John Blow	Master of the Children of the Chapel Royal; 1708–1727	Succeeded by Bernard Gates
