= Richard Carter (musician) =

18th-century English violinist and composer

Richard Carter (fl. 1728–1757) was an English violinist and composer.

== Life and career ==
The earliest record of Richard Carter is as a violinist where he performed a benefit concert at the York Buildings on 12 April 1728. He performed concerts at Goodman's Fields Theatre on April 27, 1736, and the Theatre Royal, Drury Lane on April 20, 1742. Carter was one of the original members of the Royal Society of Musicians (RSM) upon its founding in 1738. He performed in a benefit concert with fellow RSM members Frederick Bosch, Thomas Collett and Thomas Gair at Lincoln's Inn Fields Playhouse on March 15, 1743.

As a composer, Carter is known for a set of Baroque violin sonatas entitled Six Solos op.1. These sonatas were originally written for Carter's violin pupils, and he published them c.1751 in a circulation whose subscribers included the composers Johann Christoph Pepusch and Jackson of Exeter. Also known is his trio sonata Six Sonatas or Chamber Airs op.2 (c. 1756 – 1757), which was written in a galant style, and an ode on the 1755 Lisbon earthquake which was published alongside a cantata penned by Carter that had premiered at Ranelagh Gardens.

After 1757 the whereabouts and activities are unknown, and it is speculated that he died young.
