= Francis Joseph Pigott =

British engineer (1865–1939)

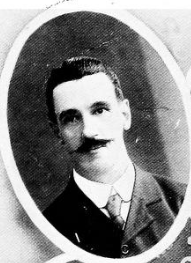
- Born: 27 June 1865; Ceylon
- Died: 5 September 1939 (aged 74); Sydney, Australia
- Occupation: Engineer

Francis Joseph Pigott (27 June 1865 – 5 September 1939) was a British engineer who served as Colonial Engineer and Surveyor-General in the Straits Settlements from 1905 to 1921.

== Early life ==
Pigott was born in Ceylon (now Sri Lanka) in 1865, and educated at Blackheath Grammar School, London.

== Career ==
After leaving school he trained as an engineer at Crystal Palace Company's engineering school, and began his career in 1882 as assistant engineer with Lucas and Aird Contractors, Westminster, before being appointed to work on the Tilbury Dock Construction works, London.

In 1887, Pigott left England and returned to Ceylon where he was first employed as a tracer in the Public Works Department, before being appointed District Engineer serving in Maradankadewali, Amradhapura and Batticaloa. In 1893, he was 2nd assistant at the Financial Office and Director of Public Works, and three years later was seconded to act as Municipal Engineer, Colombo. From 1896 to 1904 he returned to the position of District Engineer serving in Kalutara, Matale, and the Southern and Eastern Provinces, before he took up the position of Acting Assistant Director of the Public Works Department, Ceylon.

In 1905, he left Ceylon after 17 years' service having been offered the position of Deputy Colonial Engineer and Surveyor-General, Public Works Department in Penang, Straits Settlements. He served there as Colonial Engineer and Surveyor-General for 16 years before retiring in 1921.

== Death and legacy ==
He was married, and died in 1939, aged 74, in a hospital in Sydney, Australia. Jalan Pigott (formerly Pigott Road) in George Town, Penang, is named after him.
