= Maurice Greene (composer) =

English composer and organist (1696–1755)

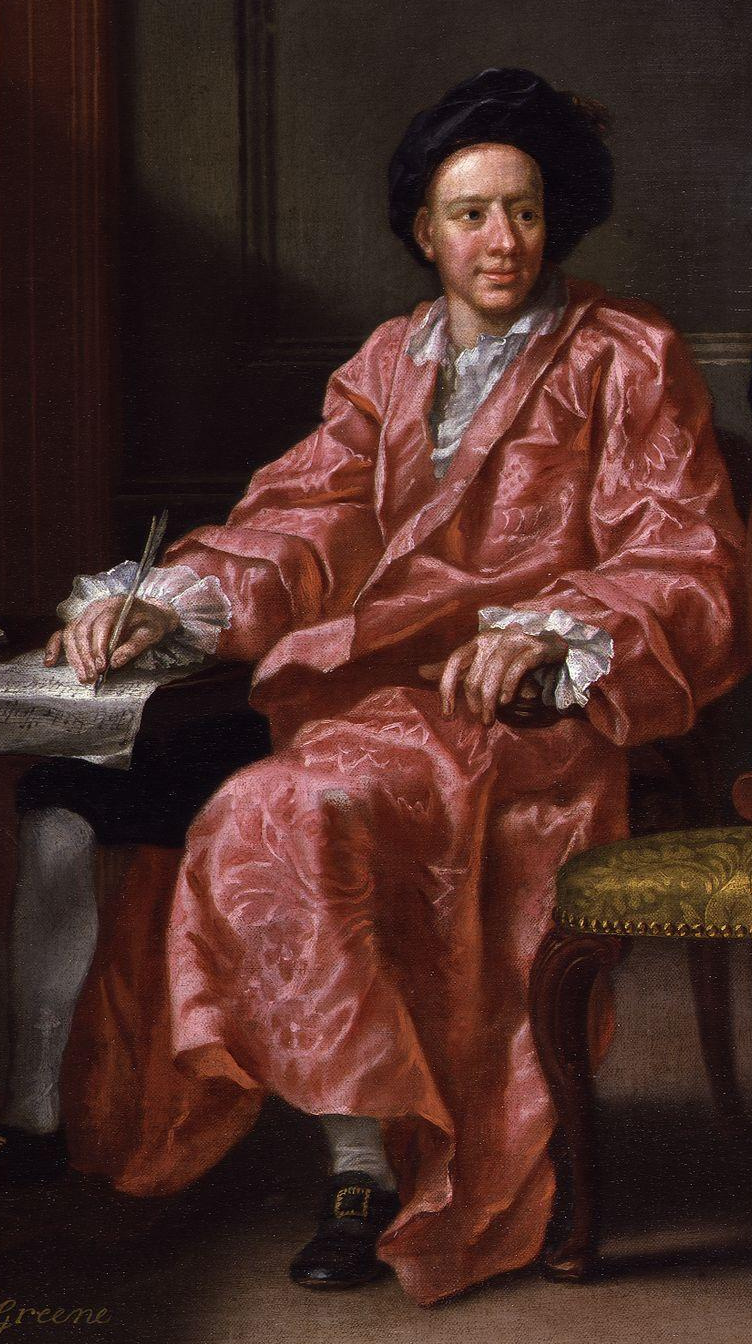
- Greene in a 1747 painting by Francis Hayman
- Born: 12 August 1696 (O.S.); London, England
- Died: 1 December 1755 (aged 59) (N.S.)
- Resting place: St Paul's Cathedral, London, England
- Occupations: Composer; organist
- Years active: 1718–1755
- Employers: St Paul's Cathedral; Chapel Royal; University of Cambridge
- Notable work: "Hearken Unto Me Ye Holy Children"; "Lord, Let Me Know Mine End"
- Style: Baroque
- Title: Master of the King's Musick
- Term: 1735–1755
- Predecessor: John Eccles
- Successor: William Boyce

Maurice Greene (12 August 1696 [O.S.] – 1 December 1755 [N.S.]) was an English composer and organist. He was an admirer and friend of George Frideric Handel.

== Biography and works ==
Greene was born in London, the son of cleric Thomas Green(e) (1648–1720), who was a chaplain of the Chapel Royal, and his wife Mary Shelton (d. 1722). He became a choirboy at St Paul's Cathedral under Jeremiah Clarke and Charles King. He studied the organ under Richard Brind, and after Brind died, Greene became organist at St Paul's.

With the death of William Croft in 1727, Greene became organist at the Chapel Royal, and in 1730, he became Professor of Music at the University of Cambridge. In 1735, he was appointed Master of the King's Musick. At his death, Greene was working on the compilation Cathedral Music, which his student and successor as Master of the King's Musick, William Boyce, was to complete. Many items from that collection are still used in Anglican services today.

Greene wrote in the prevailing Georgian England, particularly longer verse anthems, of which "Lord, Let Me Know Mine End", is a representative example. In it, Greene sets the text using a polyphonic texture over a continuous instrumental walking bass, with an effective treble duet in the middle of the work. Both this section and the end of the anthem contain examples of the Neapolitan sixth chord. His organ voluntaries—published only some years after his death—are closer to Thomas Roseingrave in style than, say, John Stanley or William Boyce, and are more contrapuntal than melodic. They do not specify manuals or stops, unlike later contemporaries such as John Bennett, Boyce, and Stanley. Instances of false relation can be heard frequently in these works. Chromaticism is also common in the voluntaries.

Greene died in 1755, aged 59, and was initially buried at St. Olave's Church, Old Jewry. Upon the church's demolition in 1887, he was reburied in St Paul's Cathedral.

== Works ==
Greene wrote a good deal of both sacred and secular vocal music, including:

- The anthem "Hearken Unto Me Ye Holy Children" (1728)
- The oratorio The Song of Deborah and Barak (1732)
- The oratorio Jephtha (1737), libretto by John Hoadly (1711–76)
- The opera Florimel (1734)
- Settings of sonnets from Edmund Spenser's Amoretti (1739).
- A collection of anthems (1743), of which the best-known is "Lord, Let Me Know Mine End"
- The opera Phoebe (completed 1747)

He also published keyboard music, including:

- Choice Lessons, for harpsichord or spinet (London, 1733)
- 6 Overtures … in Seven Parts, arranged for harpsichord or spinet (London, 1745)
- A Collection of Lessons, for harpsichord (London, 1750)
- Twelve Voluntarys, for organ or harpsichord (published posthumously by J. Bland of Holborn, London, 1779).

== Free scores ==
- Free scores by Maurice Greene in the Choral Public Domain Library (ChoralWiki)
- Free scores by Maurice Greene at the International Music Score Library Project (IMSLP)

Court offices
Preceded by John Eccles	Master of the King's Music; 1735–1755	Succeeded by William Boyce
Cultural offices
Preceded by William Croft	First Organist of the Chapel Royal; 1727–1755	Succeeded by James Nares
Preceded by Richard Brind	Organist and Master of the Choristers of St Paul's Cathedral; 1718–1755	Succeeded by John Jones
Preceded by Thomas Tudway	Professor of Music, Cambridge University; 1730–1755	Succeeded by John Randall
