= Richard Browne (fl. 1614–1629) =

English composer and organist

Richard Browne (fl 1614–1629) was an English composer and organist. He is known for his anthems; five of which survive: Christ rising again; If the Lord himself; I have declared; My God, my God, look upon me; and O Lord, rebuke me not in thy fury. 17th century documents of these anthems are part of the collection at the Bodleian Library, the Chained library at Wimborne Minster, the library of the Gloucester Cathedral, and the library of the Royal College of Music.

The earliest record of Richard Browne dates from March 26, 1614 in which he is listed in the treasurer's report of the Wells Cathedral in Wells, Somerset, England as the vicar-choral and organist of that church. In 1615 he was promoted to perpetual vicar-choral of that cathedral, and remained on the payroll in that capacity through 1619. His whereabouts after this are unknown, until records of him appear in the accounts of the Winchester Cathedral where he worked as vicar-choral and organist in 1627–1629. There are no records of Browne after this period of time.

He is not to be confused with two other English composers of the same name, Richard Browne (c.1630–1664) and Richard Browne (d. 1710).
