= John Jones (organist) =

English organist

John Jones (1728 – 1796) was an English organist, who was appointed organist at Temple Church in 1749 (succeeding James Vincent), organist at Charterhouse in 1753 (succeeding Johann Christoph Pepusch), and organist at St Paul's Cathedral in 1755 (succeeding Maurice Greene). He held the three posts simultaneously.

== Background ==
He was a chorister of St. Paul's Cathedral under Maurice Greene.

He was a composer of two volumes of harpsichord lessons, as well as some of the earliest Anglican psalm chants.

He married Sarah Chawner at Sudbury, Derbyshire.

He was buried in the chapel of Charterhouse London.

Cultural offices
Preceded by James Vincent	Organist of Temple Church for Middle Temple; 1749-1796	Succeeded by Emily Dowding
Preceded by Maurice Greene	Organist and Master of the Choristers of St Paul's Cathedral; 1755-1796	Succeeded by Thomas Attwood
