= Richard Browne (c.1630–1664) =

English composer and organist

Richard Browne (c.1630– August 1664) was an English composer and organist associated with the Worcester Cathedral. Three of his anthems are included in John Barnard's The First Book of Selected Church Musick (1641): By the waters of Babylon; If the Lord himself; and Unto him that loved us. Browne was a chorister at Worcester Cathedral in 1639, and was appointed lay clerk at that cathedral in 1642. In 1644 he was appointed a minor canon at the cathedral. He was promoted to organist and Master of the Choristers at the Worcester Cathedral on 26 April 1662. He remained in that post until his death two years later in August 1664. He was buried on August 27, 1664.

He is not to be confused with two other English composers of the same name, Richard Browne (fl 1614–1629) and Richard Browne (d. 1710).
