= John Loosemore =

English pipe organ builder (1616–1681)

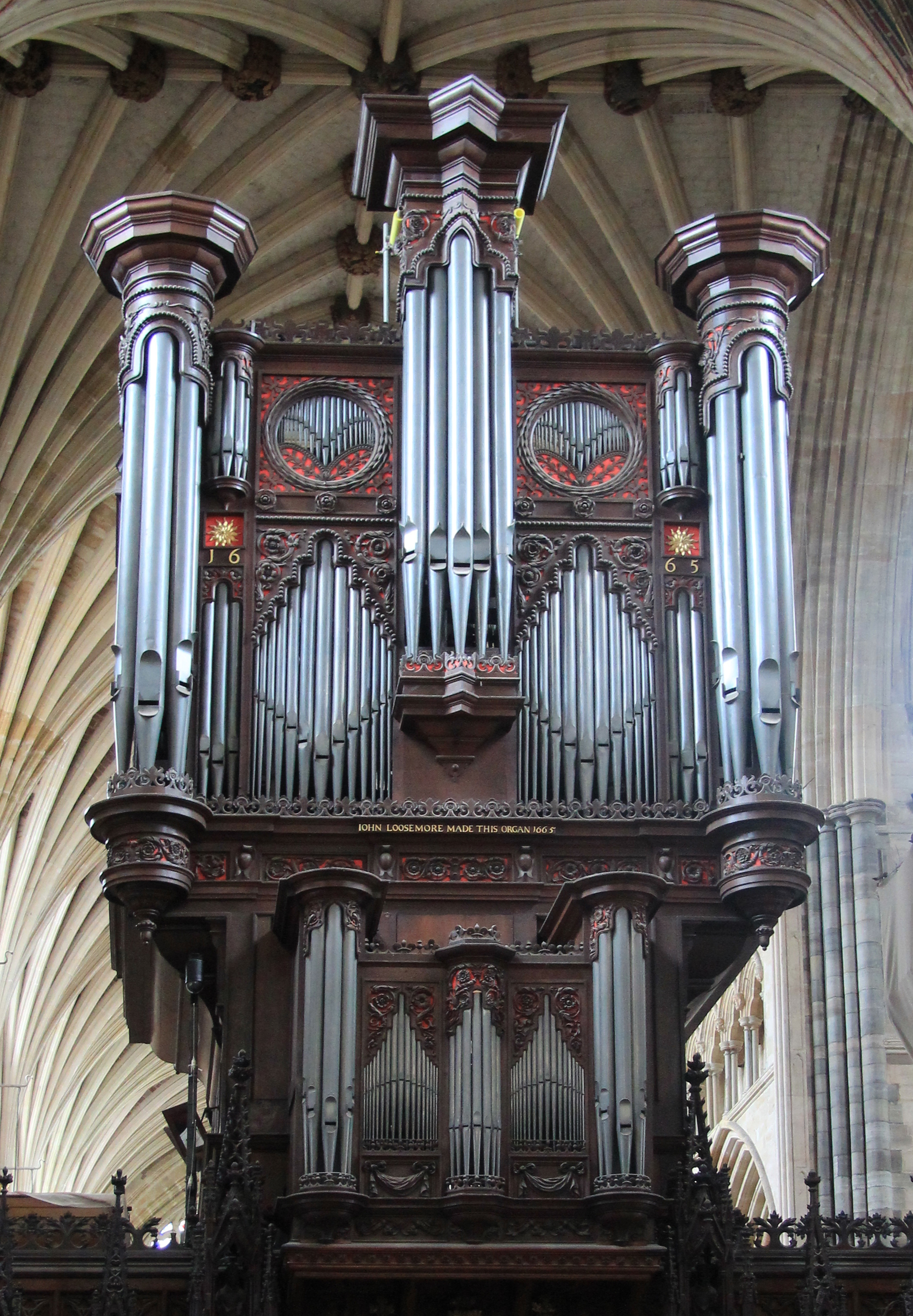
Organ by Loosemore in Exeter Cathedral

John Loosemore (August 1616 – 18 April 1681) was an English builder of pipe organs. He is best known for his organ at Exeter Cathedral in Devon, which he completed in 1665.

John Loosemore was born in Barnstaple, Devon, where he was baptised on 25 August 1616. His father was also a builder and repairer of organs, and passed on the trade to his son, who moved to Exeter sometime before 1645. The other two sons of the family, Henry and George, also had a connection with organ music as they were eventually appointed organists at King's College, Cambridge and Trinity College, Cambridge, respectively, probably under the patronage of Dudley North, 4th Baron North.

During the rule of the Puritans in Exeter from 1646 to 1660, church music was frowned upon. Many church organs, including the previous instrument in Exeter Cathedral, were vandalised or destroyed during the Civil War. During this period, Loosemore was employed primarily in repairing organs and building other keyboard instruments for private ownership. One of his virginals dated 1655 has been preserved in the Victoria and Albert Museum.

With the restoration of Charles II to the throne in 1660, Loosemore was commissioned first to repair the old organ in Exeter Cathedral, and then, in 1662–1663, to build a new one which was completed on 27 May 1665. He reported the cost of the new organ as £847.7s.10d.

Loosemore constructed at least two other organs during his lifetime: another in Exeter Cathedral for the choir school and one at Nettlecombe Court, Somerset, for Sir George Trevelyan.

After the marriage of his eldest daughter Joan to his assistant John Shearme in 1674 or 1675, Loosemore turned over much of his business to him and lived in semi-retirement. After a period of increasing infirmity, he died on 18 April 1681, and was buried in Exeter Cathedral. His gravestone was originally placed in the floor at the east end of the nave near the entrance to the south aisle of the choir, close to his organ, but has since been moved to the north choir aisle near the north wall.

He is the namesake of the John Loosemore Centre for Organ and Early Music in Buckfastleigh, Devon, founded in 1974 by John Wellingham, William Drake and Allan Thomas as a teaching establishment offering tuition in both organ playing and history, and construction of organs in an adjoining workshop. The teaching programme has been discontinued, but the building (a former Congregational chapel) remains in use by William Drake Ltd, a firm of organ builders and restorers.
