= William Savage =

English composer, organist and singer (1720–1789)

- Born: 1720
- Origin: England
- Died: 27 July 1789 (aged 68–69)
- Occupations: Composer, organist, and singer

William Savage (1720 – 27 July 1789) was an English composer, organist, and singer of the 18th century. He sang as a boy treble and alto, a countertenor, and as a bass. He is best remembered for his association with the composer George Frideric Handel, in whose oratorios Savage sang.

== Life and career ==
Savage married Mary Bolt (1718–1788), and together they had three children. William died young in the West Indies, and Rev. George Savage died in 1816. Their daughter Jane Savage was also a composer. Mary published two volumes of Poems on Various Subjects and Occasions in 1777.

=== Singer ===
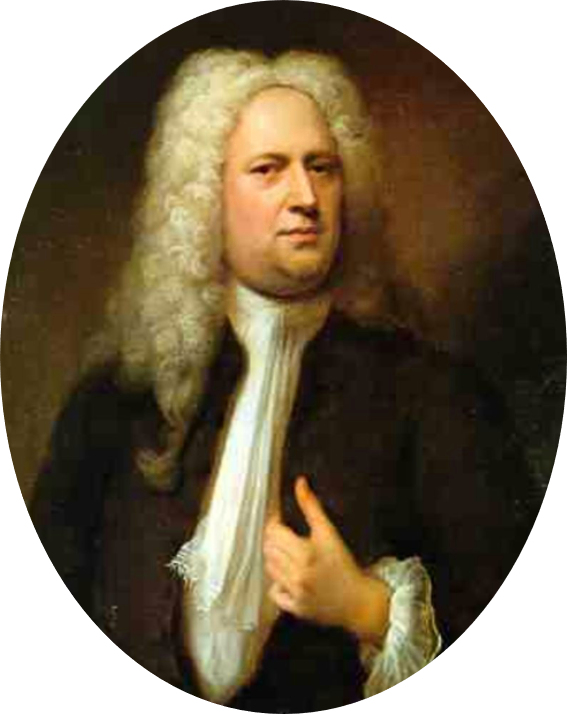
The composer George Frideric Handel, who composed many different roles in his operas and oratorios for Savage (1733)

Savage first came to prominence as a boy treble in 1735, singing in a revival of Handel's Athalia and in Alcina during the composer's Covent Garden season. The role of Oberto in Alcina was specially composed with his voice in mind and was added to the score at a later time in order just to cast him. After his voice had broken, he initially continued his career singing as an alto (countertenor), and later turned into a bass. As a countertenor he performed possibly the small roles of La Fortuna and Childerico in Handel's operas, Giustino (1737) and Faramondo (1738), and also appeared in the first performance of Israel in Egypt (1739), as well as in revivals of other Handel oratorios. As a bass, he created the title role in Imeneo (1740), the role of Fenice in Deidamia (1741) and that of Manoa at the premiere of the oratorio Samson (1743). The 18th-century musicologist Charles Burney described Savage's voice as a "powerful and not unpleasant bass". The description of his pupil R. J. S. Stevens is more complimentary: he describes Savage as possessing "a pleasant voice of two octaves", and details that Savage sang with "clear articulation, perfect intonation, great volubility of voice, and chaste and good expression".

In 1740 Savage was elected organist of Finchley Church; in 1744 he became a bass (gentleman-in-ordinary) in the Chapel Royal's choir and in 1748 he was appointed Vicar Choral, Almoner and Master of the Choristers at St Paul's Cathedral, where he influenced many of the following generation of high-class musicians. In 1777 he retired to Kent. He returned to London in 1780 to teach music but was not as successful as in previous years. He remained in London until his death there.

Some music in Savage's collection was given to the Royal Academy of Music upon the death of his student, R. J. S. Stevens, in 1837. The collection included Gloria, a composition identified as Handel's work only in 2001.

=== Composer ===
Savage was also a moderately prolific composer. He composed many anthems and other church music. His anthem "O Lord my God" is his most ambitious work and is written for accompaniment by string orchestra. He also composed music for solo violin and various canons, catches and rounds, composed for the Noblemen and Gentlemen's Catch Club, of which Savage was a member. A more idiosyncratic piece was his "On the very first of May", set to nonsense poetry written by his wife.

== Notes ==
Cultural offices
Preceded by Charles King	Almoner and Master of the Choristers of St Paul's Cathedral; 1748–1773	Succeeded by Robert Hudson
