= John Bennett (composer) =

English composer, born 1735

John Bennett (or Bennet; c. 10 March 1735, Liverpool – September 1784, in London) was an English organist and composer.

== Biography ==
Details of Bennett's life are limited, but it is known that he married one Sarah Everett in 1756 in Holborn and died in September 1784. He was buried on 24th of that month, after serving as organist at St Dionis Backchurch, Fenchurch Street in London, for over thirty years. He had outlived his wife who was buried on 15 April 1778. Both were buried at the church.

Charles Burney notes that he had been a pupil of Johann Christoph Pepusch and that he 'knew the rules of counterpoint very well'. Pearce, writing admittedly later in 1907, claims that Bennett was "an organist of sufficient talent to attract G. F. Handel to his performances". As was fairly typical in the eighteenth century, he was a diverse musician; he played the organ and the viola, taught the harpsichord, and performed at The Drury Lane Theatre as a singer in the chorus and as a dancer. Burney notes that he had 'played the tenor [= viola] and occasionally was a Chorus singer and figurante in processions'. According to Thomas Mortimer's The Universal Director (1763) and the title page of Bennett's own Ten Voluntaries for the Organ or the Harpsichord, he lived at Boswell Court near Queen Square, Bloomsbury (Holborn). The Universal Director also records him as playing the tenor in the Queen's Band. He succeeded Charles Burney as organist at St. Dionis-Backchurch, Fenchurch Street, in 1752 and was elected after audition by unanimous vote.

An interesting aside for organists is the information provided in the church vestry minutes for July 27, 1749, when Burney took up the post: ". . . that the Salary of Organist be Thirty pounds p. Ann . . . . [and] That the person who shall be chosen Organist shall attend in Person twice on every Sunday and on other usual Festivals, and have no Deputy but in case of sickness."

Gwilym Beechey suggested that in 1760 Bennett must have been suffering financial difficulty as, with permission of St Dionis, he applied for a second organist post at St John's Chapel, Bedford Row 'for the better support of himself and family', which he was unsuccessful in gaining. It was not uncommon in that period for organists to serve more than one church simultaneously. There are copious examples given in the list of subscribers to Bennett's Ten Voluntaries, and the churches were not always close to one another. We know of no further applications after this date.

== Works ==
Apart from three hymn tunes with figured bass published in Christopher Smart's (1722-1771) edition of metrical psalms, the Ten Voluntaries for the Organ or Harpsichord are his only works known to this day; they were published by the composer in 1758, and have been printed a number of times since. In the last fifty years, various selections from them have appeared in collections: H. Diack Johnstone published numbers 9 and 10 in 1966 (Novello, London); Gwilym Beechey published (nos 2, 5, 7, 8, 9 & 10) in 1969, and Diack Johnstone also published 6 of them (nos 3, 5, 7, 8, 9, & 10) in 1988. Selections can also be found in CH Trevor's series Early English Organ Music for Manuals (5 vols). A complete edition in modern notation can be found on the IMSLP site.

Five copies of the original edition survive in the British Isles. They are located in the British Library, the Oxford University Faculty Library, the Euing Library at Glasgow University, the Gerald Finzi Collection at St. Andrews University, and the Shaw – Hellier Collection, The Wodehouse near Wombourne (Staffordshire). The copies in the British Library and the collection at Oxford contain the subscription list of no fewer than 227 names including Boyce, Stanley and George Fredrick Handel.

The voluntaries are substantial works and show a high degree of originality. In his book on Early English Organ Music, Francis Routh describes them as "far the most remarkable work of the immediate post-Handel period". They comprise two, three or four sections which often have the character of short movements in their own right. They invariably call for the use of different manuals and stops to achieve particular effects. This practice was common amongst all the City organists at the time and became more detailed towards the end of the century. Francis Routh: "particularly interesting is his avoidance of stereotyped, ordinary figures associated at this time with such solo stops as the Trumpet, French Horn, or Cornet". The textures range from very rich, close harmony to solos with one-voice accompaniment. One particular characteristic that is occasionally heard in Bennett's voluntaries, but less in those of other composers of the period, is that of false relation, a feature inherited from the Tudor period. His Voluntary no. 1 also contains imitation of the cuckoo, and shows that Bennett may have had a lively sense of humour.

On comparing the score with the registration of the organ at St Dionis Backchurch, where Bennett served as organist, it is clear that the stop indications point specifically towards that particular instrument which had been installed by Renatus Harris and son John in 1724.

Some indication of tempo is given in the voluntaries, terms used being Adagio, Allegro and Vivace. English terms are also used, but both are very general and give no specific indication of speed.

== Ornamentation in the Ten Voluntaries ==
In his Voluntaries, Bennett uses three of the usual keyboard ornaments: the trill (shake), the beat (modern equivalent the lower mordent) and the appoggiatura.

The trill or shake

While the standard interpretation of a trill - beginning on the upper note - should always be tried first, alternatives could be used depending upon the context, which involves taking into account both the speed and pitch of adjacent notes. If the music is fast the number of shakes will be reduced, or even played as a simple modern-day acciaccatura. The trill (symbol tr) is used extensively in the voluntaries and in some cases includes notation for a turn. However, it is by no means clear that it cannot represent simply a mordent or acciaccatura, dependent on the surrounding figuration.

The Beat (modern equivalent to the lower mordent)
For the beat, the written note and the lower note or half-note is played according to the key.

According to Diack Johnstone "this seems generally to be regarded as the exact inversion of the trill, beginning on the note below the principal note. However, several authorities take the beat as beginning on the principal note, and it is impossible to tell from the music which interpretation is intended.".

However, the notation for the beat does not appear in Bennett's work, unlike the works of earlier Restoration composers like Matthew Locke.

The Appoggiatura This was interpreted the normal way taking half the value for an un-dotted note and two-thirds the value when the note is dotted. These occur frequently in Bennett in semi-quaver runs, in which case they are written out in full.

Whilst it is tempting to think of a particularly English mode of ornamentation, John Caldwell considers that English ornaments owed much to French style. Howard Ferguson notes that English composers cannot have been ignorant of continental practice and that ornaments such as the mordent, whatever terminology English treatises might use, were universal.

== Modern Editions ==
- H.D. Johnstone, (ed.) Preface to John Bennett: Voluntaries IX and X for Organ, Novello, London. 1966.
- H.D. Johnstone, (ed.) Preface to John Bennett: Six Voluntaries for Organ, Novello, London. 1988.
- Mortimer Thomas. The Universal Director; or, the Nobleman and Gentleman's True Guide to the Masters and Professors of the Liberal and Polite Arts and Sciences. (1763)
