= William Webb (composer) =

English composer

William Webb (c. 1600 – 1657) was an English baroque composer.

== Biography ==
In 1634, he appeared in James Shirley’s masque The Triumph of Peace as a tenor singer and lutenist and in 1656 he participated as an instrumentalist in William Davenant’s The Siege of Rhodes. Between 1637 and 1645, he was occupied as a wait of the City of London and during that time he managed to become a Gentleman of the Chapel Royal. He was a songwriter and his works suggest that he was active as a composer before 1620. His works do not appear to be among the most popular of his time, though some of his partsongs are considered as some of the best of their kind during that period.

== Works ==
- As life what is so sweet
- I wish no more
- Let me sleep this night

== Links ==
- http://www.hoasm.org/IVM/Webb.html
- http://www.rism.org.uk/manuscripts?strategy=index&search_1=webb+william&search_b=Go%21
