= Royal Society of Musicians =

British charity for Musicians

Royal Society of Musicians of Great Britain
- Abbreviation: RSM
- Formation: 1738; 288 years ago
- Founder: Michael Christian Festing and 227 other musicians
- Founded at: London, England
- Type: Charity
- Legal status: Registered charity
- Purpose: Financial assistance, advice, and support for professional musicians experiencing hardship due to illness, injury, stress, anxiety, or old age
- Headquarters: 26 Fitzroy Square, London, England
- Location: London, United Kingdom
- Region served: United Kingdom
- Official language: English
- Patron: HM King Charles III
- President: Errollyn Wallen
- Key people: Michael Christian Festing (first secretary)
- Website: www.rsmgb.org

The Royal Society of Musicians of Great Britain is a charity in the United Kingdom that supports musicians. It is the oldest music-related charity in Great Britain, founded in 1738 as the Fund for Decay'd Musicians by a declaration of trust signed by 228 musicians, including Edward Purcell (eldest son of Henry Purcell), Thomas Arne, William Boyce, Richard Carter, Johann Christoph Pepusch, Hilda Wilson, Dr. John Worgan, and George Frideric Handel. It still operates a bank account at Drummonds Bank (now part of Royal Bank of Scotland) which was opened by its first secretary, Michael Christian Festing, in November 1738.

The fund received patronage from George III, and it was incorporated by royal charter in 1790. Funds were raised by holding charity concerts, musical dinners, and music festival. Liszt gave his first concert in England for the benefit of the society in 1824, aged 12. It also held performances by Mendelssohn, Moscheles, and Dvořák. Meyerbeer, Liszt, and Clara Schumann all became members. A Society of Female Musicians was formed in 1840, but merged with the royal society in 1866.

In the days before the welfare state, membership of the royal society guaranteed a degree of financial security to professional musicians. A second royal charter was granted in 1987, confirming its aims to support to all professional musicians (not just members) and their dependents who are in need through illness, disease or old age.

HM King Charles III is Royal Patron of the Society and Dame Judith Weir DBE is President.
