= Henry Loosemore =

English organist and composer (c.1607 – 1670)

Henry Loosemore (c. 1607 – 7 July 1670) was an English organist and composer who served as organist of King's College, Cambridge from 1627 until his death.

== Life ==
Born in Devonshire, Loosemore was the son of the organ builder Samuel Loosemore. His brothers included John, also an organ builder, and George, a fellow organist.

Loosemore sang as a chorister at one of the Cambridge colleges and in 1627 was appointed organist at King's College. During the Interregnum, when organ music was frowned upon by the Puritan authorities, Loosemore became resident organist and teacher of music at Kirtling, Cambridgeshire, under the patronage of Dudley North, 4th Baron North.

== Works ==
Surviving works include Litanies in D minor and G minor and several anthems.
