= Thomas Tudway =

English musician and composer

Thomas Tudway (died 1726) was an English musician and Professor of Music at Cambridge University. He is known as a composer, and for his compilation of a collection of Anglican church music.

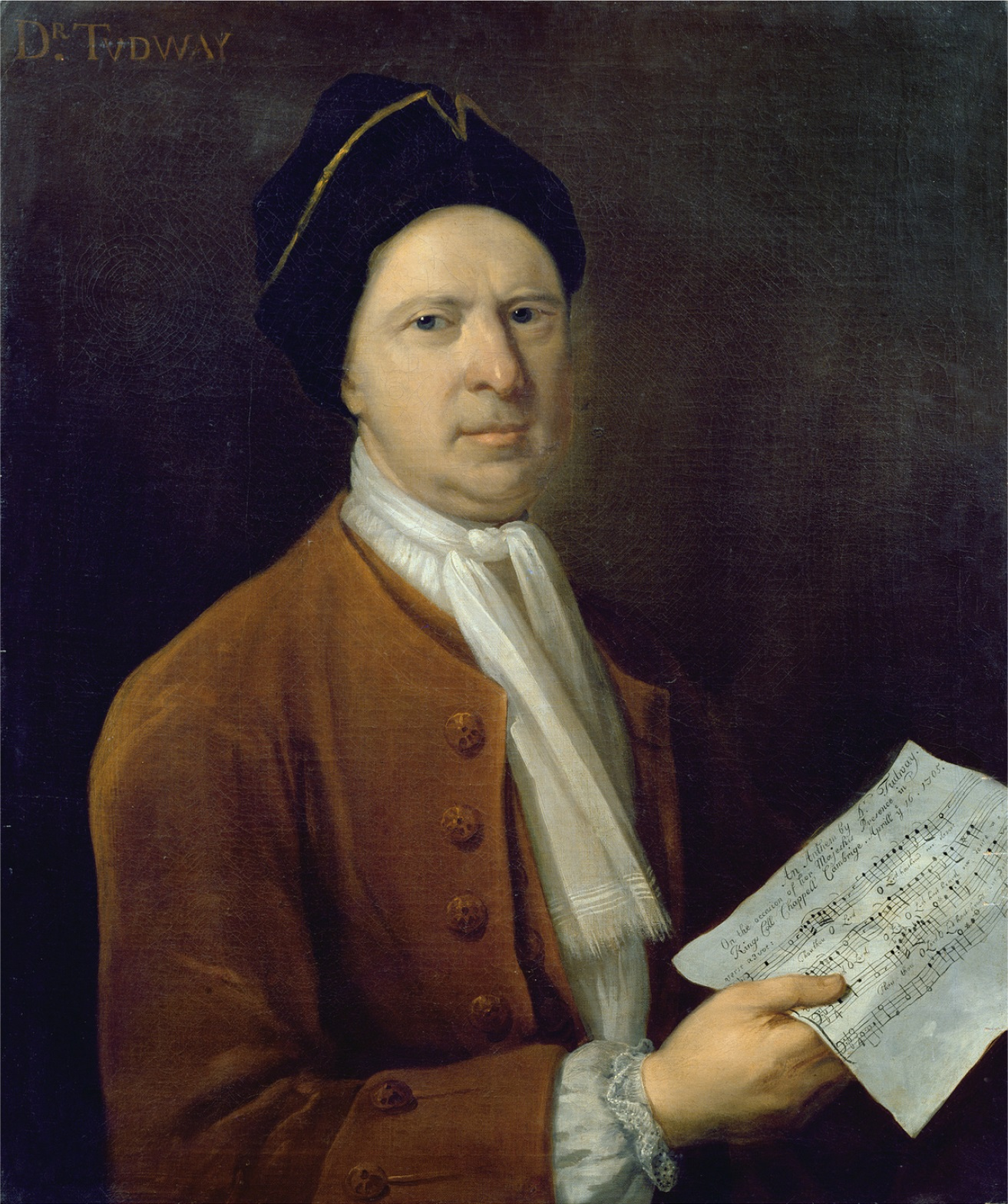
Thomas Tudway

== Life ==
Tudway was born probably before 1650, as he became a choirboy in the Chapel Royal very soon after the Restoration. He is sometimes confused with his father (of the same name) who on 22 April 1664 obtained a tenor's place in the choir of St. George's, Windsor. In 1670 he succeeded Henry Loosemore as organist of King's College, Cambridge, and acted as instructor of the choristers from Christmas 1679 to midsummer 1680. He also became organist at Pembroke College and Great St. Mary's. In 1681 he graduated Mus. Bac., composing as his exercises Psalm 20 in English and Psalm 2 in Latin, both with orchestral accompaniment.

After the death in 1700 of Nicholas Staggins, the first professor of music at Cambridge, Tudway was chosen as his successor on 30 January 1705. He then proceeded to the degree of Mus. Doc.; his exercise and anthem, "Thou, O God, hast heard our desire", was performed in King's College Chapel on 16 April, on the occasion of Queen Anne's visit to the university. He was nominated composer and organist extraordinary to the queen, but the warrant was never executed.

Noted for punning, on 28 July 1706, for an offensive comment of this nature slighting the Queen, Tudway was sentenced to be "degraded from all degrees, taken and to be taken", and was deprived of his professorship and his three organists' posts. On 10 March 1707 he publicly made submission and a retraction in the Regent House. He was then formally absolved and reinstated in all his appointments. Had he not offended the monarch, it seems likely that he would have become a Composer to the Chapel Royal. His music is at least the equal of his contemporaries. He was a Tory, one of the subscribers to John Walker's Sufferings of the Clergy, and a critic of Richard Bentley.

Tudway died on 23 November 1726, and was succeeded as professor by Maurice Greene in July 1730.

== Harleian collection ==
Political opinions may have brought Tudway into contact with Robert Harley, 1st Earl of Oxford, for whom he undertook his major work. As an addition to the Harleian Library, Tudway from 1714 copied a representative set of compositions for the Anglican church, then generally unavailable in written form. He accumulated six volumes (Harleian MSS. 7337–42), of over 3000 pages, an effort documented in correspondence with Humphrey Wanley, as he collected 70 services and 244 anthems by 85 composers; of those 19 anthems and a service were by himself. Materials came from manuscripts around England, but the collection was mainly based on old choir-books at Ely Cathedral. A detailed list of the contents appeared in Grove's Dictionary of Music and Musicians.

== Sacred music ==
Thomas Tudway's sacred music is at least the equal of his post-Restoration contemporaries. His writing for the organ as accompanimental instrument is extremely sophisticated, often using solo stops from the instrument in duet with a singer.

A chronological list of anthems.

Title	Date
My God, my God look upon me	1675
O come let us sing unto the Lord	before 1678
Blessed is the People	before 1679
Behold God is my salvation	before 1681
Quare fremerunt Omnes	1681
The Lord hear thee in the day of trouble	1681
The Lord hath declared his salvation	1682
Evening Service in A	before 1684
Not unto us O Lord	before 1685
Let us now praise worthy men	?1690s [before c.1703]
Sing we merrily	?mid-1690s [before 1706]
Is it true that God will dwell with Men?	?1697
Man that is born of a woman	1699
Evening service in B flat	?1702
I am the resurrection	1702
I heard a voice from heaven	1702
I will sing unto the Lord	1704
Thou O Lord hast heard our desire	1705
I will lift up mine eyes	1702 or 3
O how amiable	before 1705
Sing O heavens	1702 to 1705
O Sing unto the Lord a new song	before 1706
Behold how good and joyful	1707
O Praise the Lord for it is a good thing	1708
Plead thou my cause O Lord	1710
My heart rejoiceth	1713
Give the Lord the Honour Due	1713
Arise, Shine	before 1714
Te Deum and Jubilate, Commandments	1720
Hearken unto me	1724

Tudway's anthem "Is it true that God will dwell with men?" was performed in St George's Chapel, Windsor, at Queen Anne's first attendance there; and composed a thanksgiving anthem, "I will sing of Thy great mercies", for the victory at the battle of Blenheim.

The Evening Service in B flat "reflects the final stage of development” in the verse service.

In 1720 Tudway composed anthems and a Te Deum with orchestral accompaniment for the consecration of Lord Oxford's private chapel at Wimpole Hall, adding a Jubilate in 1721. The chapel itself was never consecrated and it seems unlikely that the works were performed there in Tudway's lifetime. Some songs and catches of his were published in various collections, and a birthday ode for Queen Anne was left in manuscript. The anthem "Thou, O Lord, hast heard our desire" was printed by Arnold in Cathedral Music.

== Notes ==
Attribution

This article incorporates text from a publication now in the public domain: Lee, Sidney, ed. (1899). "Tudway, Thomas". Dictionary of National Biography. Vol. 57. London: Smith, Elder & Co.
