= John Stanley (composer) =

English composer and organist (1712–1786)

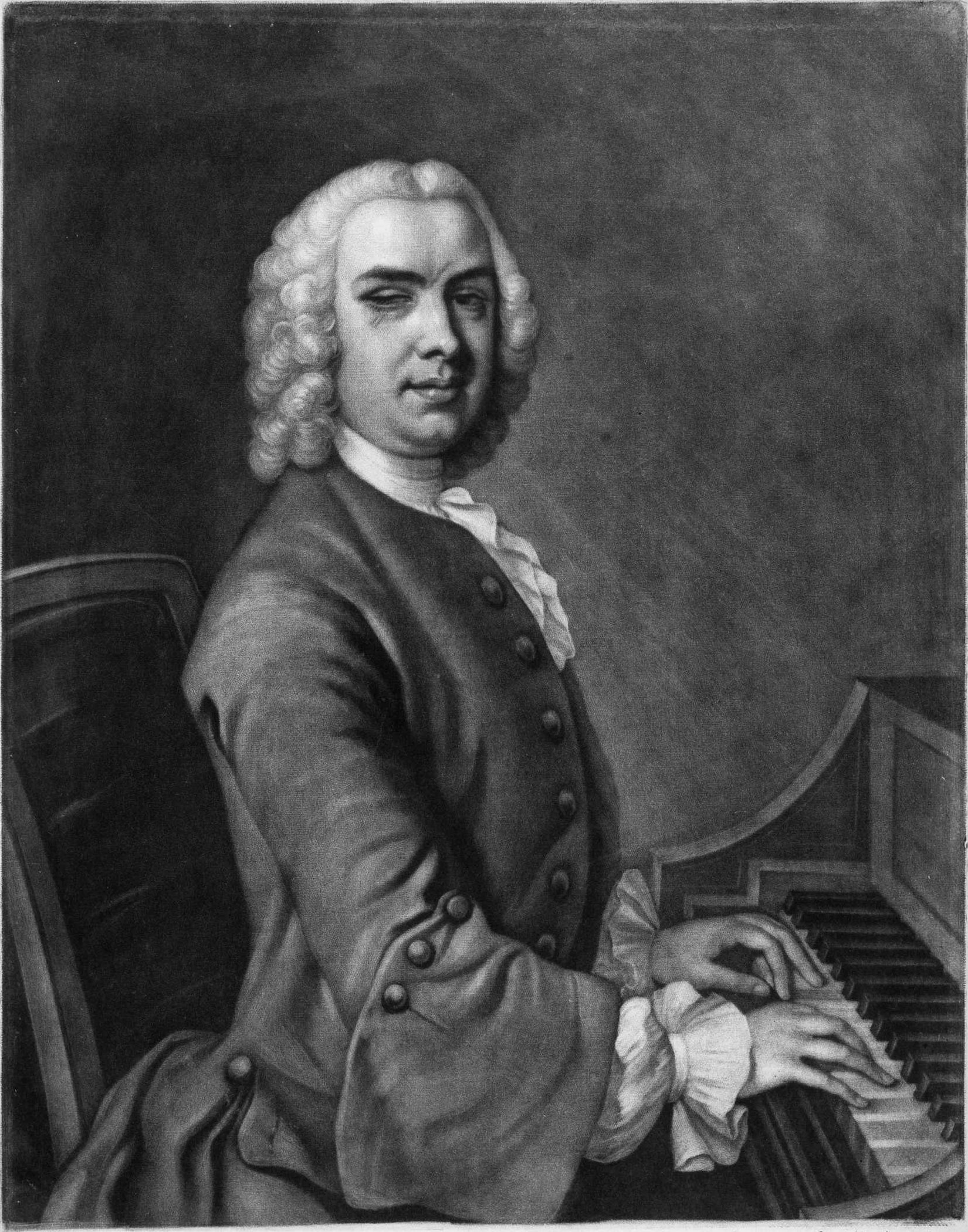
John Stanley

Charles John Stanley (17 January 1712 Old Style – 19 May 1786) was an English composer and organist.

== Biography ==
John Stanley was born in London on 17 January 1712. At about the age of two, he fell on a marble hearth with a china basin in his hand, an accident which left him almost blind.

He began studying music at the age of seven. Under the guidance of Maurice Greene, composer and organist at St. Paul's Cathedral, he studied "with great diligence, and a success that was astonishing" (Burney). At the age of nine he played the organ, probably as an occasional deputy, at All Hallows, Bread Street. When he was eleven years old, Stanley was appointed organist to the church at a salary of £20 per annum.

When he was fourteen "in preference to a great number of candidates" (Burney) he was chosen as organist at St Andrew Holborn, and at the age of seventeen became the youngest person ever to obtain the Bachelor of Music degree (B.Mus.) from the University of Oxford.

In 1734 he was appointed organist to the Society of the Inner Temple, a position which he held until his death in 1786. It was at the ancient Temple Church that his brilliant playing upon the organ and harpsichord attracted the attention of many fine musicians including George Frideric Handel, who regularly visited the church to hear him. Stanley was also an outstanding violinist.

In 1738 Stanley married Sarah Arlond (daughter of Captain Edward Arlond of the East India Company), who brought him a dowry of £7,000 per annum. Sarah's sister Ann, who at this time lived with them, became the blind composer's copyist.

Though virtually blind, Stanley had a remarkable memory, which helped him direct many of Handel's oratorios and to enjoy music-making and card games with his many friends. If he had to accompany a new oratorio he would ask his sister-in-law to play it through just once – enough to commit it to memory. He frequently played the organ at the Vauxhall Gardens and was first choice to play at charity events and at the launch of any newly built church organs. He even found time to teach. His oratorio Jephthah was first performed in 1757.

After Handel's death in 1759, in 1760 Stanley began a partnership with the composer John Christopher Smith and later with Thomas Linley, in order to continue with the series of oratorio performances at Covent Garden. For the first season Stanley composed Zimri. Stanley accompanied all oratorios, and played a concerto during each interval. Also in 1760 he composed an ode in memory of George II and as homage to George III; it was first performed at the Drury Lane Theatre. On the occasion of the King's wedding in 1762 he composed a dramatic pastoral oratorio, Arcadia.

Handel had been a governor of the Foundling Hospital, London. The hospital's chapel organ was Handel's gift, and Handel himself directed eleven performances of Messiah there, so raising £7,000 for the charity. Continuing yet again in Handel's footsteps, Stanley was elected a governor of the Hospital in 1770, and from 1775 until 1777 he directed the annual performance of Handel's Messiah in aid of the hospital funds.

In 1779 Stanley succeeded William Boyce as Master of the King's Band of musicians. In this capacity he composed many New Year and birthday odes to the king but this music has not survived. Stanley's last work was probably an ode written for the king's birthday (4 June 1786). Stanley never heard its performance as he died at his home in Hatton Garden on 19 May 1786, aged 74.

Stanley's works include the opera Teraminta, the dramatic cantata The Choice of Hercules, twelve other cantatas with texts by John Hawkins, the oratorios Jephtha, The Fall of Egypt and Zimri, and instrumental music, notably three volumes of voluntaries for organ (1748, 1752, and 1754). Nearly all of the voluntaries feature a short, slow introduction followed by either a solo-stop movement (such as the so-called trumpet voluntaries) or a fugue. Some of the former have been arranged in modern times for string chamber orchestra and trumpet.

== Works ==
Voluntary in D minor I. for organ, Op. 5, No. 8
1. Allegro

2. Adagio

3. Allegro
MIDI performance with the sample set of the Hart organ (1809) in Little Waldingfield, England

- Opus 1: Eight Solos for Flute and Continuo (1740)
- Opus 2: Six Concertos for strings (or organ & strings or flute & continuo) (1742/1745)
- Opus 3: Six Cantatas (1742)
- Opus 4: Six Solos for Flute and Continuo (1745)
- Opus 5: Ten Voluntaries for Organ (1748)
- Opus 6: Ten Voluntaries for Organ (1752)
- Opus 7: Ten Voluntaries for Organ (1754)
- Opus 8: Six Cantatas (1748)
- Opus 9: Three Cantatas (1751)
- Jephthah, oratorio (1757)
- Opus 10: Six Concertos for Organ or Harpsichord solo (1775)
- Zimri, oratorio (1760)
- Arcadia, dramatic pastoral oratorio (1762)
- The Fall of Egypt, oratorio (1774)

Court offices
Preceded by William Boyce	Master of the King's Music; 1779–1786	Succeeded by William Parsons
