= William Child =

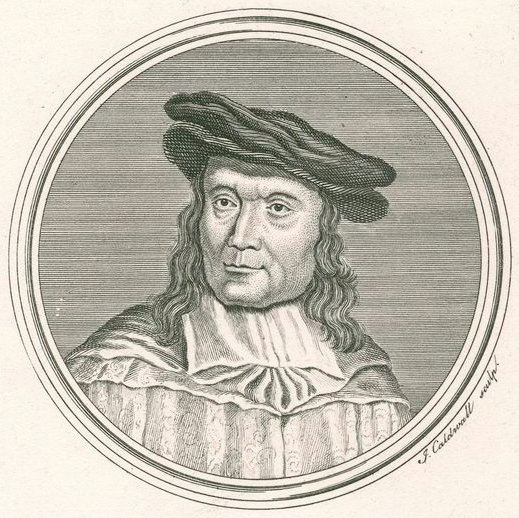
- Portrait by James Caldwall

Background information
- Born: 1606
- Died: 23 March 1697 (aged 90–91)
- Genres: Church music
- Instrument: Organ

William Child (1606 – 23 March 1697) was an English composer and organist.

== Early life ==
Born in Bristol, Child was a chorister in the cathedral under the direction of Elway Bevin. In 1630 he began his lifetime association with St. George's Chapel, Windsor Castle, becoming first a lay-clerk and, from 1632, Master of the Choristers there until the dissolution of the chapel in 1643. After the Restoration of Charles II in 1660, Child was re-appointed to St. George's, became Master of the King's Wind Music and a Gentleman of the Chapel Royal.

== Works ==
His output of church music is understandably considerable, including a set of psalms (1639), many anthems and 17 service settings. He was often influenced by the Italian 'tastes' of his time, but also wrote anthems in more conventional English forms.

Little secular music of Child survives, namely, a number of catches and instrumental pieces.

== Sources ==
- Baker's Biographical Dictionary of Musicians, Centennial Edition. Nicolas Slonimsky, Editor Emeritus. Schirmer, 2001.

Cultural offices
Preceded by New position created after the Interregnum	First Organist of the Chapel Royal; 1660-1697	Succeeded by Francis Pigott
