= William Turner (composer) =

- Born: 1651
- Died: 1740 (aged 88–89)
- Occupations: composer, countertenor

William Turner (1651/2–13 January 1740, London) was a composer and countertenor of the Baroque era. A contemporary of John Blow and Henry Purcell, he is best remembered for his verse anthems, of which over forty survive. As a singer, he was a Gentleman of the Chapel Royal from 1669 until his death.

== Life ==
Turner's association with the Chapel Royal began in the early 1660s, when he joined the choir there as a boy soprano. In 1666 his voice broke, but the year after he became master of the choristers at Lincoln Cathedral. In 1669, however, he rejoined the Chapel Royal as a countertenor, and upon the death (1672) of Henry Cooke (who had earlier cared for Turner in the year between his voice breaking and his appointment at Lincoln) became a member of the King's Private Musick. His career as a court singer continued to prosper, and he sang in works by Blow and Purcell, including the solo alto parts in the St Cecilia's Day performances of 1687 (ode by G. B. Draghi), 1692 (ode by Henry Purcell), and 1695 (ode by John Blow). An appointment as vicar-choral of St Paul's Cathedral (1687) led to another as lay vicar of the choir of Westminster Abbey (1699). After 1696 he was normally referred to as "Dr Turner", having been granted an honorary degree from Cambridge University in June of that year.

== Music ==
The substantial bulk of Turner's compositions were written before 1700, and belong, for the most part, to the genre of sacred music. Amongst these works are hymns and chants, six services, more than 40 anthems (some of which include parts for string instruments), and a Latin motet. He contributed songs and incidental music to at least five plays, including songs and a choral scene for Thomas Shadwell's The Libertine. He composed more than fifty secular songs, a great majority of which were published. He also composed a small amount of instrumental music, including a handful of works for the keyboard.
