= Jeremiah Clarke =

English baroque composer and organist (c1674-1707)

- Born: c. 1674; London, England
- Died: December 1, 1707; London, England
- Cause of death: Suicide by gunshot
- Occupations: Composer; Organist
- Known for: Trumpet Voluntary (Prince of Denmark's March)

Jeremiah Clarke (c. 1674 – 1 December 1707; sometimes spelled "Clark") was an English baroque composer and organist, best known for his Trumpet Voluntary, a popular piece often played at wedding ceremonies or commencement ceremonies.

== Biography ==
The exact date of Clarke's birth has been debated. The Dictionary of National Biography states that Clarke "is said to have been born in 1669 (though probably the date should be earlier)." Most sources say that he is thought to have been born in London around 1674.

Clarke was one of the pupils of John Blow at St Paul's Cathedral and a chorister in 1685 at the Chapel Royal. Between 1692 and 1695 he was an organist at Winchester College, then between 1699 and 1704 he was an organist at St Paul's Cathedral. He later became an organist and 'Gentleman extraordinary' at the Chapel Royal, he shared that post with fellow composer William Croft, his friend. They were succeeded by John Blow.

Today, Clarke is best remembered for a popular keyboard piece that was originally either a harpsichord piece or a work for wind ensemble: the Prince of Denmark's March, which is commonly called the Trumpet Voluntary, written in about 1700. From c. 1878 until the 1940s the work was attributed to Henry Purcell, and was published as Trumpet Voluntary by Henry Purcell in William Spark's Short Pieces for the Organ, Book VII, No. 1 (London, Ashdown and Parry). This version came to the attention of Sir Henry J. Wood, who made two orchestral transcriptions of it, both of which were later recorded. The recordings further cemented the erroneous notion that the original piece was by Purcell. Clarke's piece is a popular choice for wedding music, and has been used in royal weddings.

The famous Trumpet Tune in D (also incorrectly attributed to Purcell) was taken from the semi-opera The Island Princess (1699), which was a joint musical production of Clarke and Daniel Purcell (Henry Purcell's younger brother or cousin)—probably leading to the confusion.

== Clarke's suicide ==
"A violent and hopeless passion for a very beautiful lady of a rank superior to his own" caused Clarke to suicide. Apparently, he fell madly in love with one of his female students, a young, beautiful woman, of much higher social rank than himself. The woman was out of his league in every way, and he could not bear it. He thus decided that life was not worth living.

Clarke had been visiting a friend who lived in the countryside. He abruptly determined to leave and return to London. His friend observed his dejection, and disappointment in love, and furnished him with a horse and a servant to take care of him. While riding near London, a fit of melancholy seized him on the road and he alighted, giving the horse to the servant. He went into a field, where there was a pond surrounded by trees, and stood on the bank. He began debating with himself about whether he should drown himself in the pond or hang himself on the trees. To decide his fate, he tossed a coin in the water. The coin fell with its edge embedded in the clay, so Clarke mounted his horse, returned to London, and went back to his home in the churchyard of St Paul's Cathedral. Instead of consoling himself, he chose another method of suicide, shooting himself in the head with a pistol.

Suicides were not generally granted burial in consecrated ground, but an exception was made for Clarke, who was buried in the crypt of St Paul's Cathedral, although other sources state he was buried in the unconsecrated section of the cathedral churchyard.

=== Controversy ===
Like his date of birth, the account of his death has also been debated in some sources. For example, the story of the composer's suicide is contradicted by a contemporary broadsheet which seems to have escaped the notice of his biographers. It is a large single sheet, entitled "A Sad and Dismal Account of the Sudden and Untimely Death of Mr. Jeremiah Clark, one of the Queen's Organists, who Shot himself in the Head with a Screw Pistol, at the Golden Cup in St. Paul's-Church-Yard, on Monday Morning last, for the supposed Love of a Young Woman, near Pater-noster-Row". That account states that Clarke, a bachelor with a salary of over 300/- a year, about nine o'clock "Monday morning last" was visited by his father and some friends, "at which he seem'd to be very Chearful and Merry, by Playing on his Musick for a considerable time, which was a Pair of Organs in his own House, which he took great Delight in" and, after his father had gone, returned to his room. Between ten and eleven o'clock, his maid-servant heard a pistol go off and, running in, found that he had shot himself behind the ear. Clarke died the same day about three o'clock. "The Occasion ... is variously Discours'd; some will have it that his Sister marrying his Scholar [Charles King], who he fear'd might in time prove a Rival in his Business, threw him into a kind of melancholy Discontent; and others (with something more Reason) impute this Misfortune to a young Married Woman near Pater-Noster-Row, whom he had a more than ordinary respect for, who not returning him such suitable Favours as his former Affections deserv'd, might in a great Measure occasion dismal Effects."

Curious discrepancies exist as to the exact date of Clarke's suicide. While most sources give the date as 1 December 1707, music historian Charles Burney, followed by François-Joseph Fétis, says that the event took place on 16 July 1707. The first edition of John Hawkins fixes it as happening on 5 November 1707, which has been followed by Arthur Mendel, David Baptie, and Brown. However, Hawkins left a copy of his "History", in which he had made numerous corrections and, in that, the date appears as 1 December 1707, which is given in the 1853 edition of the work. There is an entry in the Chapel Royal Cheque Book, signed by the sub-dean, to the effect that, on 5 November 1707, Croft was admitted into the organist's place, "now become void by the death of Mr. Jeremiah Clerk", and in Barrett's English Church Composers (p. 106) is a statement that the books of the vicars-choral of St. Paul's contain an entry to the effect that "on November ye first, Mr. Jerry Clarke deceased this life". These various accounts seem irreconcilable, but the following facts throw some light on the subject:

1. In 1707, 5 November was a Wednesday, 1 November a Saturday, and 1 December a Monday. The latter date tallies with the broadsheet account, published within a week of the event by John Johnson, "near Stationers' Hall", and therefore close to Clarke's house, though no entry of the exact date of publication can be found at Stationers' Hall.
2. The burial register of St Gregory by St Paul's records the burial of Jeremiah Clarke on 3 December 1707.
3. Administration to his goods was granted by the dean and chapter of St. Paul's to his sister, Ann King, on 15 December.
4. The entry in the Chapel Royal Cheque Book was probably not made at the time, and so November might easily have been written instead of December. The order of the entries preceding and following it are: 28 January 1703, 24 March 1710–11, 25 May 1704, 5 November 1707, 12 June 1708. As well, the entry is not witnessed. With regard to the quotation from the records at St. Paul's, everything points to its being either a mistake or a misprint. Unfortunately, it is impossible to verify the statement, part of the vicars-choral records being inaccessible.

== Works ==
- Prince of Denmark's March, popularly known as Trumpet Voluntary (from the Suite in D Major)
- Trumpet Tune in D, from The Island Princess
- Harpsichord and organ music
- Chamber music, church music, masses, and other religious music (including 20 anthems and several odes)
- Theater and incidental music
- King William's March
- Ode on the Death of Henry Purcell
- Music for Dryden's ode Alexander's Feast
- The hymn tune 'Uffingham'. English Hymnal 434
- The hymn tune 'St. Magnus' (Nottingham). English Hymnal 147
- The hymn tune 'Tunbridge'. English Hymnal 481
- The hymn tune 'Bishopthorpe'. New English Hymnal 378
- The hymn tune 'Brockham'. New English Hymnal 163
- The hymn tune 'Kings Norton'. New English Hymnal 386

Cultural offices
Preceded by Isaac Blackwell	Organist of St Paul's Cathedral; 1699–1707	Succeeded by Richard Brind
Preceded by John Blow	Almoner and Master of the Choristers of St Paul's Cathedral; 1693–1707	Succeeded by Charles King
Preceded by Francis Pigott	Joint First Organist of the Chapel Royal with William Croft; 1704–1707	Succeeded by William Croft
