= Master of the Children =

Master of the Children was a prestigious and historically significant title given to an adult musician who was wholly responsible for the musical training and comprehensive general education of the choir boys (or, in modern times, boys and girls).

This position was common in major musical establishments across Europe, typically associated with church choirs, those attached to institutions such as a cathedral, monastery, or collegiate church and with Court Chapelsm which were royal or noble musical ensemble that required highlight skilled young voices. A notable example is the English Chapel Royal, where the Master of the Children trained young recruits for the choir.

== Duties and Responsibilities ==
The Master's role was far more extensive than that of a modern choirmaster, functioning as a combination of tutor, director, and guardian. The training was demanding and intended to produce professional-level musicians.

- Musical Direction: The Master oversaw the musical direction of the entire choir, which included both the adult singers (Gentlemen of the chapel) and the child choristers (Children of the chapel). This involved teaching vocal technique, music theory, and repertoire for liturgical services.
- General Education: Beyond music, the Master was tasked with the boys' general academic instruction and their overall welfare. This education could encompass basic arts, humanities, languages, and values, reflecting the comprehensive nature of the training.
- Impressing Boys: In the English system, the Master of the Children of the Chapel Royal held a unique and powerful authority known as the right to "impress" (compel into service) promising young boy trebles from provincial choirs across the country for service in the royal chapel. This power was formally documented to exist at least until 1684.
