= John Blow =

English composer (1649–1708)

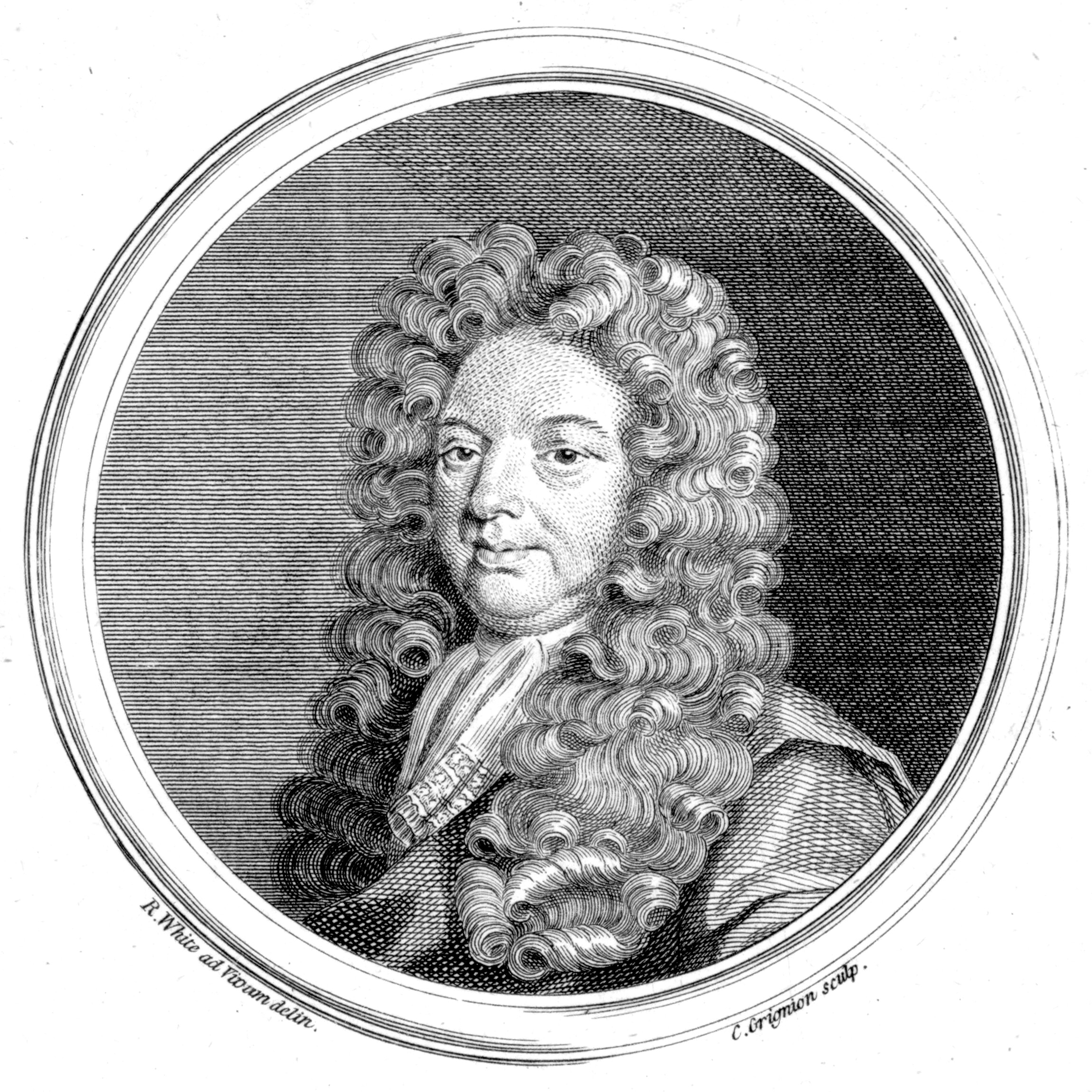
- 18th century engraving by Charles Grignion the Elder after Robert White
- Born: Collingham, Nottinghamshire, England
- Baptised: 23 February 1649
- Died: 1 October 1708 (aged 59); London, England
- Occupations: Composer; organist

John Blow (baptised 23 February 1649 – 1 October 1708) was an English composer and organist of the Baroque period. Appointed organist of Westminster Abbey in late 1668, his pupils included William Croft, Jeremiah Clarke and Henry Purcell. In 1685 he was named a private musician to James II. His only stage composition, Venus and Adonis (ca. 1680–1687), is thought to have influenced Henry Purcell's later opera Dido and Aeneas. In 1687, he became choirmaster at St Paul's Cathedral, where many of his pieces were performed. In 1699 he was appointed to the newly created post of Composer to the Chapel Royal.

== Early life and education ==
Blow was probably born in the village of Collingham, Nottinghamshire. The parish registers at Newark record the baptisms of Blow and of his brother and sister, the marriage of his parents, and the burial of his father. The register of degrees at Lambeth notes that in 1677, on taking his doctorate, Blow said that his birthplace was 'the faithful borough of Newark'. As he was baptised on 23 February 1649, he was likely born only a short while before. As a boy, he was selected as a chorister of the Chapel Royal, and distinguished himself by his proficiency in music.

Blow composed several anthems at an unusually early age, including "Lord, Thou hast been our refuge", "Lord, rebuke me not" and the so-called "club anthem", "I will always give thanks", the last in collaboration with Pelham Humfrey and William Turner, either in honour of a victory over the Dutch in 1665, or more probably simply to commemorate the friendly intercourse of the three choristers.

== Career ==
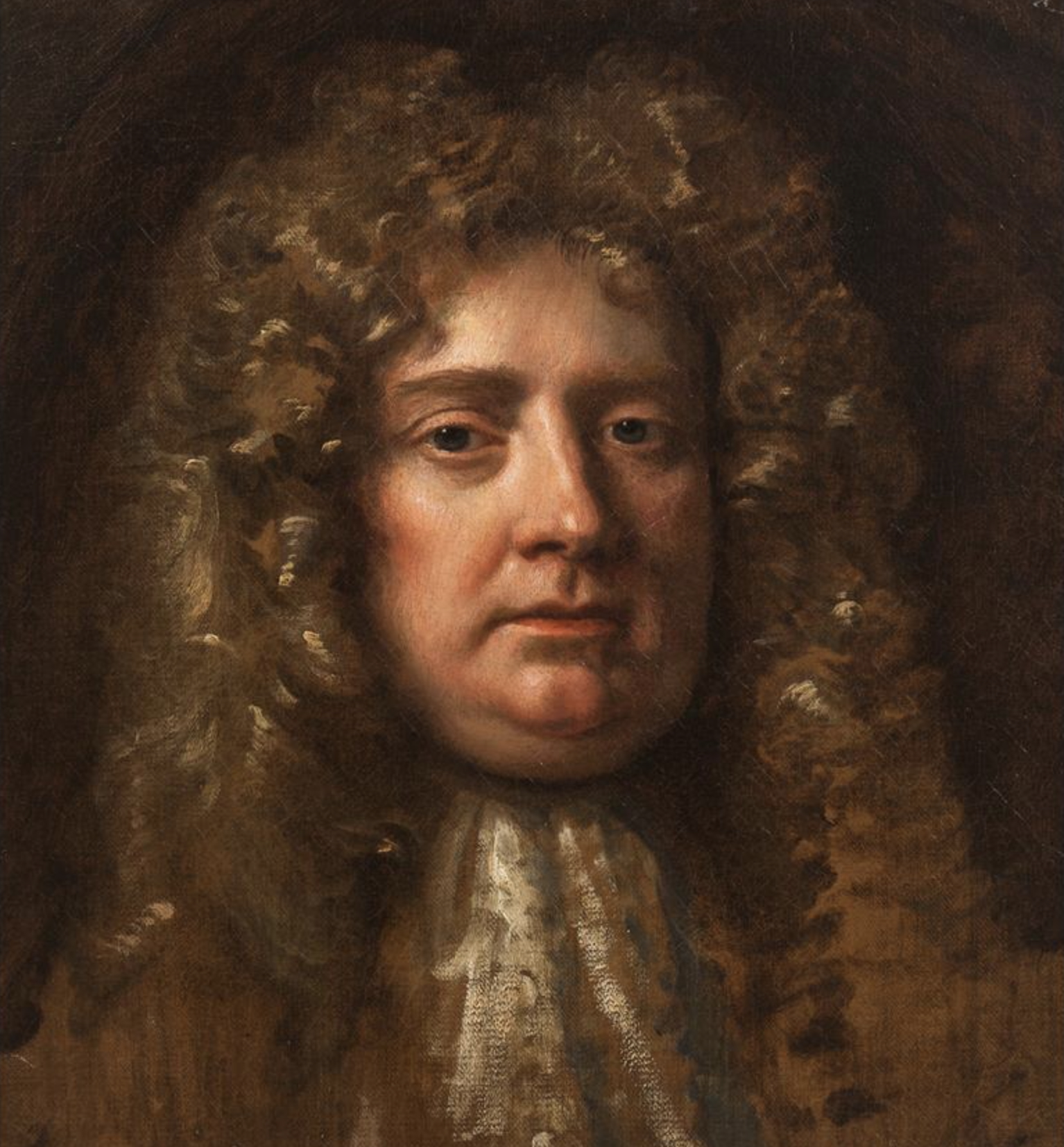
Portrait attributed to Sir Peter Lely (private collection)

In 1668, he was an organist at Westminster Abbey. He composed a two-part setting of Robert Herrick's "Goe, perjur'd man", written at the request of Charles II to imitate Giacomo Carissimi's "Dite, o cieli". In 1674, he was made a gentleman of the Chapel Royal and Master of the Children of the Chapel Royal.

Blow, who by 1678 was a doctor of music, was named in 1685 one of the private musicians of James II. Between 1680 and 1687, he wrote his only stage composition of which any record survives, the masque for the entertainment of the King, Venus and Adonis. In this, Mary Davis played the part of Venus. Lady Mary Tudor, her daughter by Charles II, appeared as Cupid.

In 1687, Blow became choirmaster (or Master of the Choristers) at St Paul's Cathedral. In 1690 he built a house for himself in Hampton. (Blow also owned eight other houses in the vicinity of Westminster Abbey). The Hampton house was demolished in 1799. It was on the site of the present-day house known as Beveree in the High Street.

In 1695 he was elected organist of St Margaret's, Westminster, and is said to have resumed his post as organist of Westminster Abbey, from which in 1679 he had retired or been dismissed to make way for Purcell. In 1700, he was appointed to the newly created post of Composer to the Chapel Royal.

== Music ==
John Blow's "Prelude" (MIDI rendition)

Blow's Almand in A minor performed on virginals

Blow wrote fourteen services and 30 odes for royal celebrations, 50 secular song-like pieces and more than a hundred anthems.

In addition to purely ecclesiastical music and his relatively well-known masque Venus and Adonis, Blow's works include Great sir, the joy of all our hearts, an ode for New Year's Day 1682, similar compositions for 1683, 1686, 1687, 1688, 1689, 1693 (?), 1694 and 1700; odes, and the like, for the celebration of St Cecilia's Day for 1684, 1691, 1695 and 1700; for the coronation of James II, two anthems, "Behold, O God, our Defender" and "God spake sometime in visions"; some harpsichord pieces for the second part of Henry Playford's Musick's handmaid (1689); Epicedium for Queen Mary (1695) and Ode on the Death of Purcell (1696).

In 1700 he published his Amphion Anglicus, a collection of pieces of music for one, two, three and four voices, with a figured bass accompaniment. This includes a setting for voice and continuo of the poem "The Self Banished" by Edmund Waller.

== Personal life ==
In September 1673, Blow married Elizabeth Braddock. She died in childbirth ten years later. Two of his sons died, though he also had three daughters, all of whom survived past his death.

Blow died on 1 October 1708 aged 59 at his house in Broad Sanctuary. He is buried in Westminster Abbey.

== Legacy and honours ==
- Collingham John Blow Primary School, Nottinghamshire, is named after him.
- Commissioned by the City of Birmingham Symphony Orchestra, Arthur Bliss composed Meditations on a Theme by John Blow in 1955 based on Blow's verse anthem "The Lord is my Shepherd".
- The tercentenary of his death was marked by BBC Radio 3 and Westminster Abbey: the weekly broadcast of choral evensong was made by the Choir of Westminster Abbey, live from the Abbey, and consisted of music mostly by him and by his near contemporaries.

Cultural offices
Preceded by Albertus Bryan	Organist and master of the choristers of Westminster Abbey; 1668–1679	Succeeded by Henry Purcell
Preceded by Henry Purcell	Organist and master of the choristers of Westminster Abbey; 1695–1708	Succeeded by William Croft
Preceded by Michael Wise	Almoner and master of the choristers of St Paul's Cathedral; 1687–1703	Succeeded by Jeremiah Clarke
Preceded by Pelham Humfrey	Master of the Children of the Chapel Royal; 1674–1708	Succeeded by William Croft
