= Westfield Hornsby =

Shopping centre in New South Wales, Australia

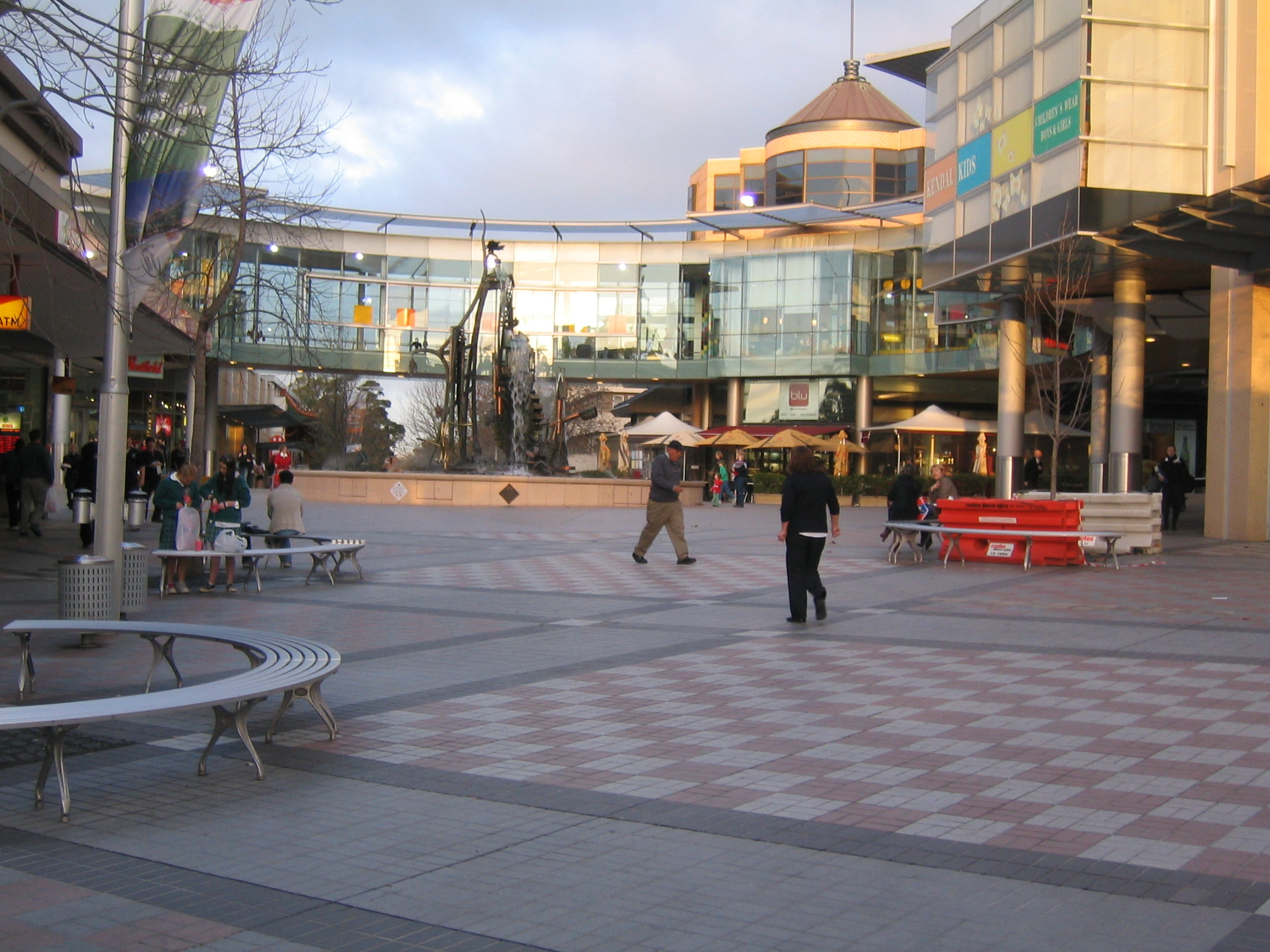
- Location: Hornsby, New South Wales, Australia
- Coordinates: 33°42′15″S 151°06′03″E
- Address: 236 Pacific Highway
- Opened: July 1961 (original); 26 September 2001 (current)
- Developer: Westfield Group
- Owner: Scentre Group
- Num. of stores: 314
- Num. of anchor tenants: 8
- Floor area: 99,550 square metres (1,071,500 sq ft)
- Floors: 3
- Parking: 3,200
- Public transit: Hornsby railway station; 575, 591
- Website: westfield.com.au/hornsby

Westfield Hornsby is a large indoor and outdoor shopping centre in the suburb of Hornsby on the Upper North Shore of Sydney.

== History ==
The original Westfield Hornsby known as Westfield Plaza opened in July 1961. The centre featured McDowells (later rebranded as Waltons and then Venture), Coles New World and 25 stores.

In 1968 Westfield Hornsby received its first major redevelopment which saw the centre quadruple in size. The centre was also upgraded in 1976 and 1979.

A competing shopping centre opened on 14 November 1979 by Deputy Premier Jack Ferguson and Hornsby Shire President Don Evans. The shopping centre known as Northgate featured Grace Bros (rebranded to Myer in 2004), Kmart and 67 speciality stores.

In the early 1990s the intersection of Florence Street and Hunter Street became a pedestrian mall with a fountain at the centre of the pedestrian mall. The fountain known as the Hornsby Water Clock was designed by Victor Cusack, who previously designed the Pacific Family fountain in 1988 at Warringah Mall. The fountain was unveiled in 1993.

=== 2000–2001 redevelopment ===
In 1999 Westfield purchased the Northgate Shopping Centre and commenced its four stage redevelopment. This redevelopment involved the closure and demolition of the original Westfield centre and incorporation of adjacent Northgate Centre into the development. In January 2000 Westfield was temporarily closed to pave way for the new centre which doubled the retail space and added restaurants and cinemas at a cost of $360 million over a two-year period. During this redevelopment, the original Westfield centre was demolished and rebuilt, making it the second Westfield to be completely demolished after Westfield Burwood. It also extended and refurbished the former Northgate centre.

The development opened in four stages. Stage one of the redevelopment opened in the former Northgate side in October 2000 with the Northgate name dropped and part of Westfield. This stage included the opening of Coles and 50 stores.

Stage two opened in May 2001 which was the old Westfield Hornsby side. This stage was physically separated from the stage 1 site until August when the 2 stages joined together via an underground level. This stage included the opening of Woolworths and 40 speciality stores.

Stage three was completed in September 2001 which included the opening of David Jones, Target, Gowings, a food court and 100 stores.

Westfield Hornsby had its official grand opening on the 26 September 2001.

Stage four of the development opened on 29 November 2001 with the opening of the nine screen Greater Union Cinema (now Event Cinemas) and restaurant precinct which opened on 25 November 2001.

=== 2001-Present day ===
In 2005 the three level Gowings store closed and was replaced by JB Hi-Fi on the upper level, Macro Wholefoods (rebranded as Thomas Dux on 26 September 2009 before closing in April 2016, becoming a Toys R Us store until it closed in 2018, and is now a Uniqlo store which opened in April 2019) on the middle level, and Dan Murphy's on the lower level.

On 24 September 2011 Apple opened its 13th store in Australia in the centre.

In July 2014, as part of a restructure of the Westfield Group, it came under the control of the Scentre Group.

On 12 January 2020 Myer closed down its store after 40 years of trade and was replaced by Harvey Norman on the Upper level which opened on 3 October 2020, with TK Maxx & Baby Bunting on the second floor. Baby Bunting was later replaced by Planet Fitness in April 2026.

On 4 October 2025, the Apple Store closed in favour of a refurbished store at Chatswood Chase.

In November 2026, David Jones announced that will close its store in the centre by the end of 2026. It was previously included on a list of 5 underperforming stores running at a loss that were planned for closure before David Jones entered administration.

== Tenants ==
Westfield Hornsby has 99,550m² of floor space. The major retailers include David Jones, TK Maxx, Kmart, Target, Aldi, Coles, Woolworths, Uniqlo, Apple, Harvey Norman, JB Hi-Fi, Rebel, Fitness First, KOKO Amusement and Event Cinemas.

== Transport ==
The North Shore and Northern lines offer frequent train services to Hornsby station which is a short walk from the centre.

Westfield Hornsby has bus connections to the Sydney CBD, North Shore, Northern Suburbs and Hills District, as well as local surrounding suburbs. It is served by CDC NSW bus services. The majority of its bus services are located on Pacific Highway in front of the centre as well as on Station Street on the other side of the station.

Westfield Hornsby also has multi level car parks with 3,200 spaces.

== Incidents ==
- On 18 November 2013, a tornado formed over the Hornsby area. There was damage to the Westfield complex as part of the roof collapsed over Event Cinemas. Nearby, a demountable structure was completely uplifted and landed a few metres away. There were no reported injuries. Media frequently reported the tornado as a 'mini-tornado' however, no such classification exists. The Bureau of Meteorology classified the tornado as an EF1 with winds between 117 km/h to 180 km/h.
- On 13 February 2015, a bomb threat caused a centre lockdown, and the central plaza was evacuated. There were unconfirmed reports that a man left a bag unattended at a restaurant and told staff it was a bomb. The man was later taken into police custody.
- On 31 March 2016, a man was stabbed to death at a restaurant by his partner's ex-husband. The attacker allegedly walked into the restaurant at 9.30pm, took a knife from the kitchen and stabbed the pair. The woman suffered serious injuries to her chest and a punctured sternum. Witnesses allege that after he stabbed the pair, he calmly walked up and down the shopping centre's concourse, covered in blood and carrying the 20 cm knife in his hand. He surrendered himself to police arrest without incident.
- On 9 June 2016, a patient from a nearby psychiatric hospital escaped and confronted pedestrians at the central plaza. The man was confronted by police and was shot after he attempted to retaliate. As a result, three bystanders were injured by ricocheting bullets that struck them in the legs.
