= Patrick Power (lawyer) =

Australian lawyer

- Born: 12 May 1952 (age 74)
- Occupations: Former Senior Counsel; Former Deputy Senior Crown Prosecutor NSW Department of Public Prosecutions
- Status: Since released
- Conviction: Possession of child pornography
- Penalty: Sentenced to 15 months imprisonment with a minimum of eight months

Patrick John Piers Power (born 12 May 1952) is a former Senior Counsel in New South Wales, Australia. He was Deputy Senior Crown Prosecutor at the NSW Office of the Director of Public Prosecutions (DPP). In May 2007, he was convicted of possessing child pornography.

== Early life ==
According to Who's Who in Australia, Power was educated at Barker College in Hornsby, an Anglican Church school. He lived in Turramurra during his formative years and Power obtained his law degree at the Australian National University (ANU), his master's degree at the University of Sydney and accomplished an MBA at the University of New South Wales. He returned to Sydney University to work on his PhD and he completed his PhD thesis at the ANU on comparative restorative justice practice.

== Legal career ==
Power was admitted as a barrister and worked for 16 years as a prosecutor in serious criminal cases (including sex cases). He was also the chairperson of the New South Wales Youth Justice Advisory Committee and Power was instrumental in promoting and helping draft the Young Offenders Act 1997 (NSW) which instituted restorative justice conferencing for young offenders. He was a consultant to the New South Wales Government on the implementation of restorative justice processes for adults.

== Arrest and conviction ==
On 3 July 2006, Patrick Power requested the information technology department of his office to repair his personal computer which had been experiencing technical problems. During repairs, the technician examining the computer discovered a sub-directory (folder) containing evidence of files associated with child pornography including 31 video files and links to additional material on a removable hard drive. The technician notified his superiors and Power was subsequently arrested on 6 July 2006.

Power pleaded guilty to possessing child pornography during his court appearance at Sydney's Downing Centre Local Court. Victorian chief Crown prosecutor Jeremy Rapke said Power had collected in excess of 29,000 pornographic images including 433 pictures and 31 videos depicting children.

59 members of the community, including defence barristers and prosecutors, provided references of Power's good character to the court.

== Sentencing and release ==
On 9 May 2007, Power was sentenced to 15 months imprisonment, to serve a minimum of eight months, but was released on bail when his lawyers lodged an appeal against sentence. The appeal was dismissed on 14 June 2007 and Power was imprisoned for seven months.

The New South Wales Bar Association sought to have The Daily Telegraph prosecuted for contempt of court, contending that it published Powers' referees' names in order to "humiliate, pillory and thus punish people for the simple fact of providing material by way of references." The complaint was withdrawn after the Telegraph published an apology.

Power's practicing certificate was suspended by the New South Wales Bar Association. He was released from gaol on 18 January 2008.

On 17 June 2008, the New South Wales Court of Appeal found Patrick Power guilty of professional misconduct, that he was not a fit and proper person to remain on the Roll of Legal Practitioners, and that his name be removed from the Roll of Legal Practitioners.
