= Nathan Tutt =

Australian rugby league footballer

Personal information
- Full name: Nathan Tutt
- Born: 23 January 1980 (age 45); Hornsby, New South Wales, Australia

Playing information
- Height: 183 cm (6 ft 0 in)
- Weight: 102 kg (16 st 1 lb)
- Position: Second-row, Lock
Club
Years	Team	Pld	T	G	FG	P
2001	Sydney Roosters	1	0	0	0	0
2002–03	St. George Illawarra	19	4	0	0	16
2004–06	Manly Sea Eagles	19	1	0	0	4
	Total	39	5	0	0	20

Nathan Tutt (born 23 January 1980) is a former professional rugby league footballer who played for the Sydney Roosters, St. George Illawarra Dragons and Manly Warringah Sea Eagles.

== Playing career ==
Tutt made his first grade debut for Sydney Roosters in Round 18 2001 against the Northern Eagles.

In 2002, Tutt moved to St George and in his first season played in both finals games for the club.

In 2004, Tutt joined Manly-Warringah and played 3 seasons for the club before retiring.
