= Old Man's Valley Cemetery =

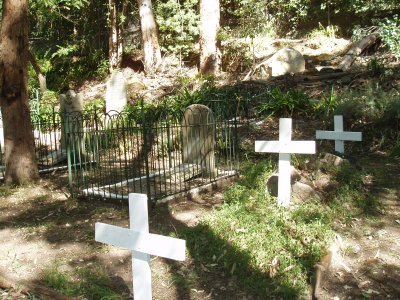

- Location within Sydney Location within Australia
- 33°41′58″S 151°05′33″E
- Location: Old Man's Valley, off Quarry Road, Hornsby, Hornsby Shire, New South Wales, Australia

History
- Built: 1879–1931

Site notes
- Architect: Members of the Higgins family
- Owner: Hornsby Shire Council

New South Wales Heritage Register
- Official name: Old Man's Valley Cemetery; Higgin's Family Cemetery; Old Mans Valley Cemetery; Higgins Family Cemetery
- Type: State heritage (complex / group)
- Designated: 22 December 2006
- Reference no.: 1764
- Type: Cemetery/Graveyard/Burial Ground
- Category: Cemeteries and Burial Sites
- Builders: Members of the Higgins family; Monumental masons

Old Man's Valley Cemetery is a heritage-listed former cemetery and now memorial landscape at Old Man's Valley, off Quarry Road, Hornsby in the Hornsby Shire local government area of New South Wales, Australia. It was designed by and built by members of the Higgins family between 1879 and 1931 with the assistance of monumental masons. It is also known as Higgin's Family Cemetery, Old Mans Valley Cemetery and Higgins Family Cemetery. The property is owned by Hornsby Shire Council. It was added to the New South Wales State Heritage Register on 22 December 2006.

== History ==
=== Indigenous history ===
Old Man's Valley is associated with an Aboriginal family story in a recent history book by Peter Read, Haunted Earth. Read describes taking Dennis Foley, an Aboriginal man whose traditional land is to the east of Hornsby, to Old Man's Valley:

'[We] drove up the ridge to the Hornsby site. As he looked at the map in the car, Dennis' pulse quickened. Long before we arrived, he knew where we were going. In the company of his Gai-mariagal elder, Uncle Gar, who had taught him so much of the lore of the sandstone, he had already been there as a child. 'Travelling in the late 1950s from Fairfield, with his own son and Dennis, to go fishing at Bobbin Head, Uncle Gar had detoured five kilometres to Hornsby, to show the boys the site, amongst the highest points on the ridge that divides Berowra Creek from Cowan Creek. Perhaps, Dennis now wonders, he wanted to pay his own respects. From his uncles, Dennis learnt that Old Man's Valley is a woman's site in the edge of the escarpment, a dolerite outcrop, female to the relational male dolerite hill, already mined to destruction, near Blacktown on the western Sydney plain. A freshwater spring, now evidently dry or destroyed, used to bubble from the bottom of what is now a quarry. Traditionally, it was guarded by Gurang, the old Kangaroo people - perhaps this is why the area is still known as Old Man Valley. The boys were told to stay in the car while Uncle Gar muttered words under his breath, and walked agitatedly about the site. Dennis says: I remember he was like a startled rabbit.'

— Peter Read, in Haunted Earth.

=== European Settlement of Old Man's Valley ===
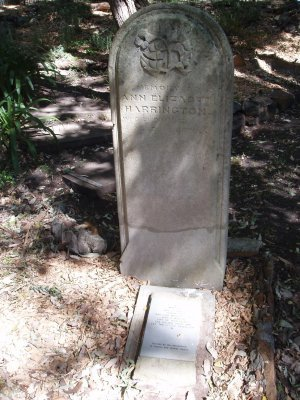
Ann Elizabeth Harrington headstone

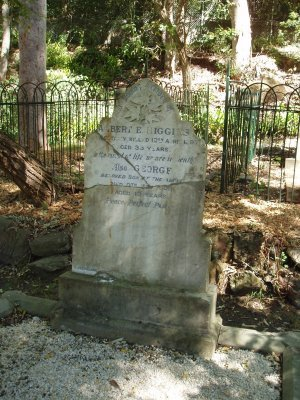
Albert E. Higgins headstone

The family that established the cemetery are descendants of Second Fleet transportees, Thomas Edward Higgins and Eleanor McDonald. Eleanor's first husband, First Fleet convict David Killpack, was granted 32 hectares (80 acres) in the Field of Mars district (modern Carlingford). Eleanor and David were the first free settlers within the present day boundaries of Hornsby Shire Council. Following David's death in 1798, Eleanor sold part of the land but continued to farm some 30 acres of it in her own right. In 1799, she married Thomas Higgins, their son, Thomas Edward II being born in 1800. Thomas and Eleanor remained on their farm until their deaths in 1828 and 1835 respectively. Thomas Edward II was made a district constable for the Field of Mars district and in 1823 was promised a grant of land that included a relatively fertile valley west of the ridge now occupied by the Hornsby shopping centre. He is thought to have named the grant Old Man's Valley. In taking up the grant, Thomas Edward II became the first settler in the Hornsby area. After his death, ownership of the land passed to his son, Thomas Edward III whose large family formed the basis of the community that was established in the valley. It is believed that Thomas Edward III established the cemetery when his youngest son, Harrold died. It is further believed that the cemetery was consecrated as an Anglican burial site when Thomas himself was interred there in 1885. However the Anglican Diocese of Sydney has no record of this consecration, although it is acknowledged that a local consecration may have taken place and the local records lost. The earliest dated inscription in the cemetery records the death of Ann Elizabeth Harrington (daughter of Ann and Matthew Harrington) who died aged 14 months in 1871. Ann was not, however, buried in the cemetery, but within the orchards on the Harrington property and the inscribed stone is a memorial rather than a grave marker. In the period of its use from 1879 to 1931, 25 persons are known to have been interred there and it reliably recalled that a family midwife, Ann Harrington, buried some still-born and other non-surviving babies within the confines of the cemetery. It is also believed by family members that the cemetery was used for the burial of stillborn babies and other infants in unmarked graves near the east boundary. The establishment and use of the cemetery appears to be a direct response to the isolation of the valley and the difficulties of transporting the dead to the existing formal burial grounds, as well as a reflection of the strong connection between the Higgins family and the valley.

In the early 20th century, matters concerning the burial of the dead were increasingly regulated with the passing of the Public Health Act 1902, and in sections of the Local Government Act 1919. Mrs. Dorothy Jansson remembers applying for special permission to enable the burial of Loretta Jansson in 1931, which was granted because of the economic hardship of the Great Depression. Thomas Higgins IV also wished to be buried in the cemetery but this was prevented by legal requirements. With the advent of the motorised funeral which became increasingly common from the 1930s, the conveyance of the dead became easier. In addition, new cemeteries supplemented the existing burial grounds available to the residents of the North Shore. By the late 1960s, the last of the Higgins family left the valley, and the last standing residence, the house erected on the site of the original homestead built by Thomas Edward Higgins II, and residence of Thomas III and Ann Elizabeth Rhodes/Pollard, was demolished. This house was last occupied by Percy Higgins (tenth child of Thomas III and Ann), his wife, Clifton Forrest, and later their daughter Freda and her husband, Mr. Jones. A monument dedicated to the pioneering Higgins family was erected by Farley and Lewers on the site of the house in 1970.

=== Deterioration of the Cemetery ===
The appearance of the cemetery in the early twentieth century is shown in surviving photographs taken c. 1910-1920. During this time the cemetery was enclosed by a morticed and tenoned, timber post and two railed, split-paling fence which defined and separated it from the surrounding area. A cleared fire-break was maintained around the cemetery area. Early photographs show that the family plots were extensively planted with both introduced and native species including alyssum, violets, lilies, daisies, climbing roses and bracken fern. Later photographs (c. 1960s to 1980s) also show the presence of snowdrops, belladonna lilies, watsonias and ornamental oxalis. By the late 1920s to early 1930s, the original timber fence had been replaced by fencing of timber posts with wire strands. At this time, access to the cemetery was through a gate positioned in the southwest corner. The boundary of the cemetery was further maintained by the presence of a clipped privet hedge which was maintained by Norman Higgins. After the 1930s, the Higgins family cemetery was no longer used for the burial of family members; however it appears that it was sporadically maintained by family members still living in the valley. During the late 1950s to early 1960s, the cemetery suffered a series of attacks by vandals. The railings and corner posts of many grave surrounds were broken or dislodged and the upper sections of many headstones were broken. Photographs taken in the mid 1960s show the cemetery in a state of neglect and decay and several additional damaged and overturned cemetery monuments are evident. Another major attack by vandals which resulted in additional destruction of monuments and increased scattering of fragments away from their original locations was reported in The Advocate in 1969. It appears that a timber post and wire fence which remained extant until the early twenty-first century was erected at this time.

=== Rock mining in Old Man's Valley ===
In c. 1903, blue metal began to be quarried from the Old Mans Valley. It was hauled out by horse and dray, two draught horses being used in tandem for the steep climb up the escarpment. Once the ridge had been reached, one of the horses was unhitched and tethered in the shade whilst the other delivered the load. By the 1920s, the quarry was in full production and operating on a commercial scale. Hornsby Shire Council acquired the lease to operate a quarry from the then land owner during this time. Four years later, Hornsby Road Metal Limited acquired the lease of the quarry, which they held for more than ten years. When Hornsby Road Metal Ltd first took over the lease of the quarry, crushed blue metal was being hauled to the ride in skips on a narrow railway line. As production increased, a continuous chain of buckets was installed to deliver crushed rock to the screening plant, 91 metres (300 ft) above the valley floor. During the 1930s, bushland walks were apparently created around the quarry as part of unemployment relief. The quarry operations were temporarily closed down during World War II, and work did not recommence until the 1950s. In 1954, the Council sub-leased the quarry. The lessee worked the quarry until 1959 and production increased dramatically during this time. In 1959, Hornsby Blue Metal Pty Ltd, a subsidiary of Farley & Lewers Ltd, acquired the quarry and Council lease. Farley & Lewers commenced management of the present quarry operation and acquired several of the original Higgins family properties. Farley & Lewers was subsequently taken over by CSR Ltd and incorporated within the Readymix Group. CSR Readymix continued to operate the quarry until its recent acquisition by Council. Products produced by the quarry included road base and aggregates.

=== Acquisition by Hornsby Council ===
In recent years, the quarry became increasingly unviable due to the poor quality of extracted material and the then owners, CSR Ltd, explored opportunities to fill the site with either waste or virgin excavated material, or rezone areas of the side for medium density residential development. Neither of these proposed options was undertaken and CSR Ltd subsequently served notice on Council to acquire the site on 22 March 2001. In accordance with Council's obligations under the HSLEP, and the statutory processes required under the Land Acquisition (Just Terms Compensation) Act, Council obtained the approval of the Minister for Local Government on 9 May 2002 to acquire the quarry site and the adjacent lands. The final transfer of title was formalised on 31 May 2006.

=== Higgins family conservation of the cemetery ===
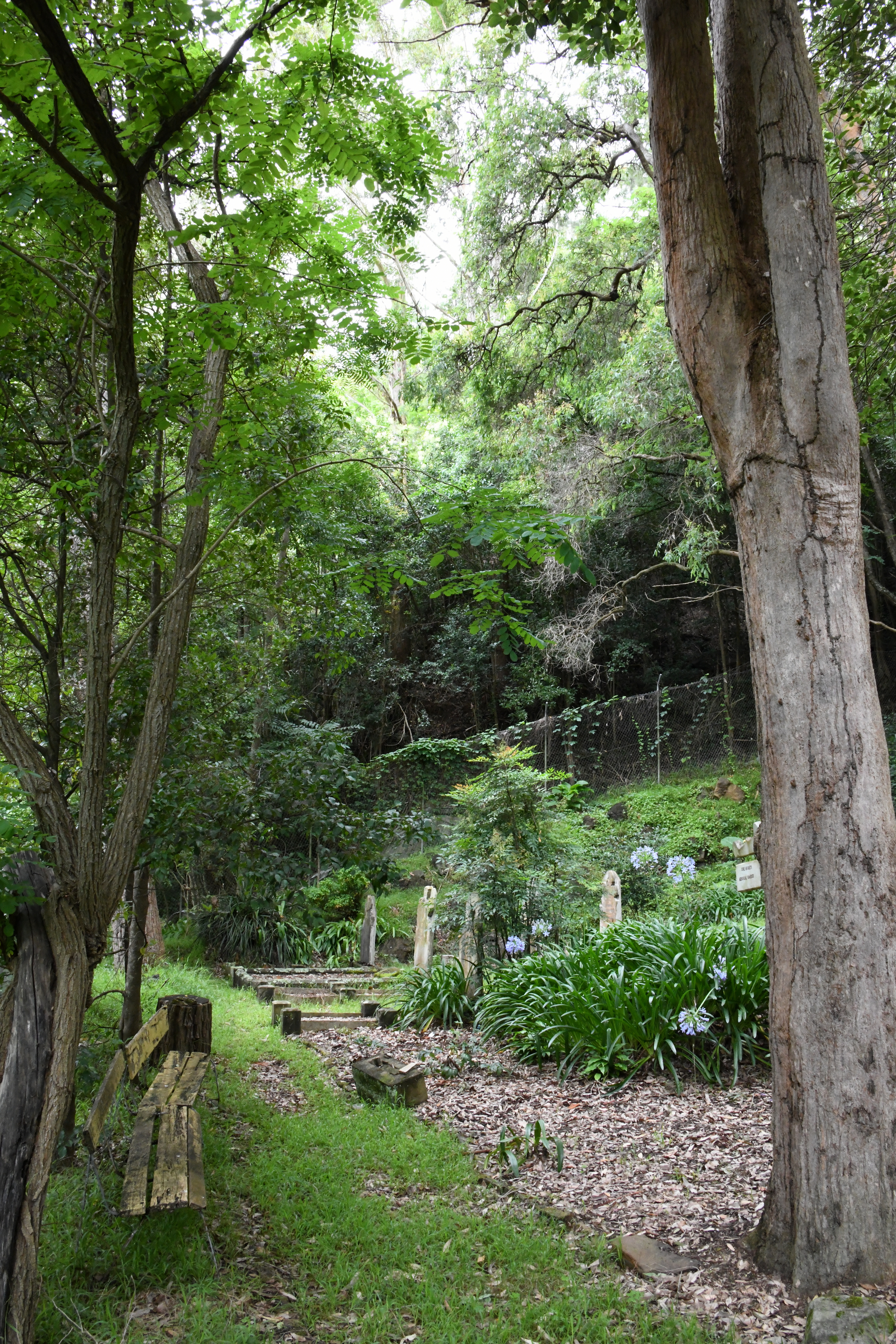
General view of cemetery

In 1992, a Conservation Plan was prepared by Godden Mackay Logan and a cemetery restoration project commenced. The work proceeded under the guidance of archaeologist, Siobhan Lavelle who supervised volunteer workers from the Higgins family and friends. A stonemason was engaged for the skilled restoration of graves and monuments with family members restoring metal fencing around the graves. A security fence was erected to protect the work and a silt trap and site drainage works were completed to protect the site from damage due to run off. The project was completed in March 1994. One of the objectives of the Conservation Plan was to provide education resources. These resources comprised the erection of an interpretive sign on the site of the cemetery and the preparation of an educational brochure. The conservation work was supported by a grant from the New South Wales Government on the recommendation of the Heritage Council of New South Wales. Thus the preparation of the conservation plan was funded by the NSW Heritage Council, the first such example of public funding for conservation works in a private cemetery. Financial contributions were also made by the National Trust of Australia and descendants of Thomas and Eleanor Higgins. Assistance in kind was provided by the Council of the Sihire of Hornsby and CSR Pty Ltd (former owners of the land). As part of its Heritage Week Celebrations since 1998 Hornsby Council has promoted Open Days and guided bushwalks in Old Man's Valley, including a tour of the Old Man's Valley Cemetery. A Guide to Berowra Valley Regional Park (BVRP) was published in 2001 by Friends of BVRP, a subcommittee of the Bushland Management Advisory Committee formed under the auspices of Hornsby Shire Council. The Guide contains a discussion on Old Man's Valley and the Higgins Family Cemetery. Hornsby Council Library distributed copies of Memories of Old Man's Valley, a private publication prepared by Ted Angelo in 1999, which references the Old Man's Valley Cemetery. Rangers and descendants of the Higgins family also carry out regular educational discovery activities to the Old Man's Valley Cemetery on behalf of the National Parks and Wildlife Service. These guided walks provide an opportunity for local and interstate visitors including culturally diverse groups to experience a social and historic connection with earliest European settlement. The cemetery has thus become the focus of considerable heritage interest. This galvanisation of institutional and community resources provides an exemplar for the conservation of other family cemeteries in NSW.

== Timeline for southern Old Man's Valley ==
The following timeline covers the southern Old Man's Valley:

- Pre-European – Aboriginal people of the Dharug, Kuringai and Darkingung language groups lived in the Hornsby area
- 1820 – Study area settled by Higgins family, who were the first Europeans to permanently live in the Hornsby area. Thomas Edward Higgins was promised a land grant of 250 acres by Governor Brisbane in 1823 with the land grant formally recorded in 1836 by Governor Bourke.
- 1830s-1880s – Higgins cleared 35 acres and cultivated it for orchard and market garden production. Thomas Higgins died in 1885 and was buried in what is now the family cemetery.
- Late 1880s – Part of Higgins land was sold and then subdivided. The remainder continued to be used for farming, orcharding and market gardening by relatives of Thomas Higgins.
- Early 1900s – Mining operations commenced and the quarry was opened as a hard rock quarry. Blue metal was quarried and carried out of the quarry by horse and cart.
- 1920s – By 1924 the quarry was in full production and operating at a commercial scale by Hornsby Road Metal Ltd. Later, Hornsby Council acquired a lease to operate the quarry.
- 1930s-1950s – Quarry worked irregularly by Council.
- 1951 – Study area zoned Green Belt under County of Cumberland Planning Scheme.
- 1954-1959 – Council sub-leased the quarry and lessee mined the quarry intensively and increased production.
- 1959 – Hornsby Blue Metal Pty Ltd, a subsidiary of Farley & Lewers acquired the quarry and Council lease. Farley and Lewers was then taken over by CSR Limited and incorporated within the Readymix Group.
- 1977 – Quarry zoned Open Space under Hornsby Planning Scheme Ordinance. (Continuation of statutory obligation.)
- 1982 – Eastern section of study area first identified for use for sporting activities. Council consent to carry out land fill operations to eastern section of study area to a maximum finished level.
- 1988 – Old Man's Valley (Higgins) Cemetery is listed by the National Trust, following interest generated by the impending Bicentennial celebrations, which generated interest in local pioneers and the state of the Cemetery
- 1989 – Council approval to continue land fill operations to raise ground level of platforms by a further eight to 14 metres and delay development of sporting fields.
- 1990 – The Cemetery conservation project received a Hornsby Council heritage award in recognition of its outstanding conservation work.
- 1990 – A NSW Land and Environment Court case to enforce Council consent conditions relating to land fill operations and develop sporting fields. Court case arises from resident objections.
- Late 1990s – CSR Readymix continue to operate the quarry until it becomes no longer viable to continue mining operations because of the poor quality of extracted material and introduction of recycled concrete as a cheaper material for road base.
- 1994 – Study area zoned Open Space under the Hornsby LEP. The Open Space zoning under the Local Environmental Plan continued obligation for Council to acquire the quarry site upon receipt of a notice in writing from the owner to do so.
- March 2002 – CSR Readymix serves notice on Council to acquire the quarry site.
- May 2002 – Council ownership of quarry site commences.
- February 2004 – Council approaches environmental and planning consultancies to undertake planning study.

== Description ==
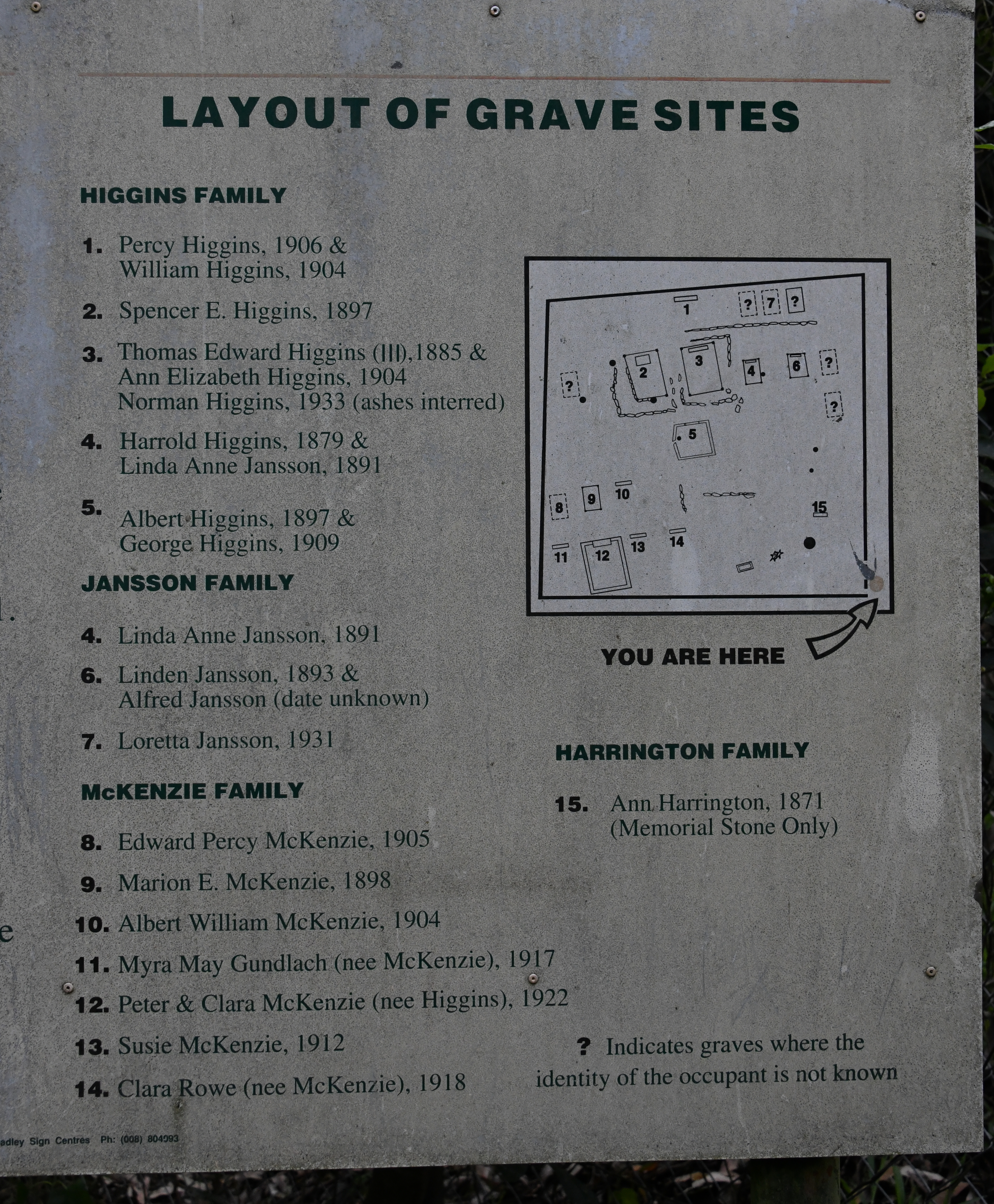
Graves in the cemetery

The Old Man's Valley Cemetery is bounded by cyclone fencing and located near a road leading to Hornsby. The Cemetery rises steeply from east to west; overburden from quarry activities has been piled adjacent to the southern and western boundaries of the Cemetery. The Cemetery contains at least twenty-three known burials, however, only fifteen marked gravestones, and five marked but unidentified graves remain visible.

When it was established during the 1880s, the Old Man's Valley Cemetery was apparently set out as a square area, its probable dimensions approximately 20 metres (66 ft) by 20 metres (66 ft). The wire security fence now enclosing the area is set back from the original boundary by a distance of 2–3 metres (6 ft 7 in – 9 ft 10 in).

The earliest graves in the cemetery were arranged in east-facing rows, a traditional orientation. As the number of burials in the cemetery increased during the early 20th century, it seems that a number of conscious decisions were made regarding planning and layout. The cemetery gradually became more formalised with distinct groupings of graves for each branch of the family. The McKenzie family plots occupied the southeast corner, the Jansson family plots occupied the northwest corner, the Higgins' family plots occupied the centre and western area and the unmarked infants' graves were placed along the eastern boundary towards the northeast corner.

The earliest headstones in the cemetery are of sandstone, but the majority of the monuments are marble headstones. Remnants of other grave furniture is also extant, including iron fences with hooped railings, sandstone kerbing and quite elaborate grave surrounds formed by "barley twist" pattern cast iron railings. These are affixed to small stone corner posts and additional borders are formed by white-painted bricks placed diagonally in the ground to give edging with a zig-zag profile.

The graves are linked by paths and informal gardens comprising native shrubs as well as species representing some of the exotics used as grave plantings by the families (e.g., alyssum (Lobularia maritima), violets (Viola odorata), lilies (Lilium spp.) and freesias (Freesia spp./cv.s).

The cemetery is enclosed in remnant native forest including eucalypt and angophora species mixed with introduced species such as privet (Ligustrum spp.) and black locust (Robinia pseudoacacia). The mature remnant native trees presently on the site suggest that some native species were deliberately retained within the cemetery area. The vegetation provides an attractive setting and screens the cemetery from the nearby quarry and the surrounding residential areas, thus preserving its serenity.

Interpretative signage outlining the history of the cemetery and identifying the graves is in the north-eastern corner, by the double gate that provides the only access to the site.

The cemetery has been maintained since c. 1990by family descendants, who have uncovered plot edgings and some hitherto unknown stones.

=== Condition ===
The cemetery suffered several incidents of vandalism during the mid-twentieth century, during which the railings and corner posts of many grave surrounds were broken or dislodged and the upper sections of many headstones were broken and scattered. As a result of extensive, professionally directed conservation work conducted in 1992–94, and regular ongoing maintenance since then, the cemetery has been largely restored to its original state. While some of the monuments cannot be fully restored, most are in very good condition. The design and layout of the cemetery have been accurately preserved. The legibility of some of the inscriptions is deteriorating because of weathering, but where appropriate, inscriptions have been recorded on mental plaques placed near their respective monuments. The cemetery is now in sound condition, with the continued maintenance and visitation of local family members ensuring its preservation.

The cemetery was restored in 1992 under the supervision of a professional conservator (Siobahn Lavelle/Godden McKay Pty Ltd). Standard conservation procedures were followed, including the use of photographic and other documentary evidence. The cemetery has been systematically and regularly maintained since that time.

=== Modifications and dates ===
Photographs and the surviving physical evidence on the site, indicate that the monumental masonry erected in the cemetery was of fairly standard types and designs. The earlier headstones in the cemetery were of sandstone, but a majority of the monuments were marble headstones. The most elaborate monument in the cemetery was a sculptured angel figure on the pedestal on the grave of Spencer E. Higgins, 1897 - this monument has not survived. The early twentieth century photographs also show the presence of other grave furniture in the cemetery including quite elaborate grave surrounds formed by "barley twist" pattern cast iron railings affixed to small stone corner posts and additional borders formed by white-painted bricks placed diagonally in the ground to give edging with a zig-zag profile. Only a few remnants of these features now survive. The other surrounds used in the cemetery were either iron fences with hooped railings of which several examples survive, or simple sandstone kerbing. The original wooden fence and privet hedge that marked the original boundary have virtually disappeared. In 1992, a Conservation Plan was prepared and a cemetery restoration project commenced under the supervision of an archaeologist and with the help of a stonemason and the volunteer labour of Higgins family members. A security fence was erected to protect the work and a silt trap and site drainage works were completed. An interpretive sign on the site of the cemetery was also erected.

== Heritage listing ==
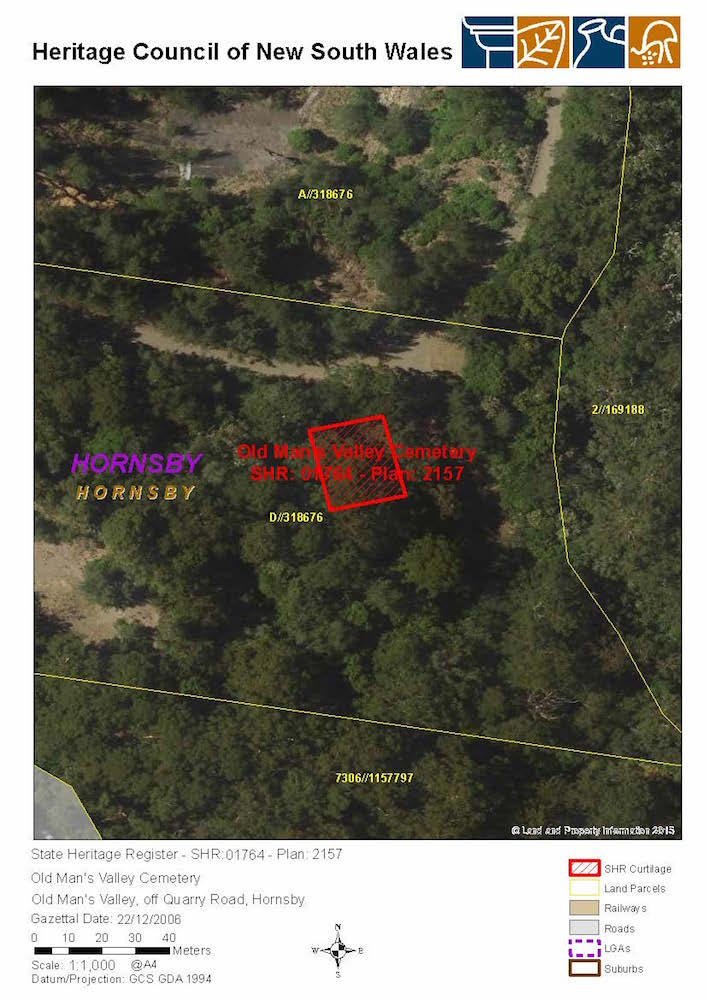
Site location and boundaries

As at 21 December 2006, the Old Man's Valley Cemetery was of State significance as one of the few fully conserved family cemeteries in New South Wales. It is also of State significance for the social value - firstly to a wide array of Higgins family descendants (now living all over Australia) who have funded its conservation over many years, accessing both professional advice and their own labour. Its significance to the wider community is by its role as a heritage destination by visitors, cemetery enthusiasts and educational institutions. Acquired by Hornsby Shire Council in 2006, it provides a model of how a family cemetery may be conserved and valued.

Sited in Old Man's Valley, which was first agricultural land then a bluestone quarry (recently decommissioned), the cemetery is associated with the economic development of the locality and also has high local historical significance for its graves memorialising the descendants of Hornsby's earliest European settler family, Thomas Edward Higgins, son of Thomas Higgins and his wife Eleanor McDonald. Containing twenty-three known burials with interments dating from 1879 to 1931, its dates are unusually late for a private cemetery. Its establishment and use appears to have been a direct response to the isolation of Old Man's Valley and the difficulties of transporting the dead to established communal burial grounds. It is also of high local significance for its representative examples of late nineteenth and early twentieth century monumental masonry, providing a good record of the designs, inscriptions, motifs indicative of funerary symbolism and practices used in a modest family cemetery in NSW at that time. The cemetery also has high representative significance at a local level for its landscape setting amid both remnant natural vegetation and traditional European grave plantings.

Old Man's Valley Cemetery was listed on the New South Wales State Heritage Register on 22 December 2006 having satisfied the following criteria.

The place is important in demonstrating the course, or pattern, of cultural or natural history in New South Wales.

Old Man's Valley Cemetery is of state significance for demonstrating the earliest application of professional conservation techniques and management methods to a small private cemetery in NSW. It has since provided an exemplar for the proper conservation and protection of cemeteries generally, and small isolated cemeteries in particular, undertaken in accordance with the first publicly funded conservation plan prepared for a private cemetery in NSW.

Sited in "Old Man's Valley", which was first agricultural land then a bluestone quarry (recently decommissioned), the cemetery is not only associated with the economic development of the locality but has local historical significance for its evidence of the settlement and occupation of the Old Man's Valley by a pioneering settler family. The cemetery is now the major surviving physical evidence in the valley of almost 150 years of occupation by the Higgins family. An unusually late private cemetery with interments dating from 1879 to 1931, its establishment and use appears to have been a direct response to the isolation of Old Man's Valley and the difficulties of transporting the dead to established communal burial grounds. The ages of those buried (more than one third of whom did not reach maturity) attest to the hardships of pioneer life. The Old Man's Valley cemetery serves as a distinctive reminder of the part that early convict settlers and their descendants played in the social, cultural and economic development of NSW.

The place has a strong or special association with a person, or group of persons, of importance of cultural or natural history of New South Wales's history.

Containing twenty-three known burials, the Higgins Family Cemetery is of local significance for its associations with the Higgins family, a pioneering settler family of the Hornsby Shire [other families?] who occupied the Old Man's Valley continuously from the 1830s to 1970. The cemetery contains the burial site of the grandson of the original settlers - Second Fleet convicts Thomas Edward Higgins and his wife Eleanor McDonald - and also records the continuing presence of the descendants of these pioneer settlers in the Old Man's Valley.

The place is important in demonstrating aesthetic characteristics and/or a high degree of creative or technical achievement in New South Wales.

The cemetery is of local significance for its representative examples of late nineteenth and early twentieth century monumental masonry, providing a good record of the designs, inscriptions, motifs indicative of funerary symbolism and practices used in a modest family cemetery in NSW at that time.

The place has a strong or special association with a particular community or cultural group in New South Wales for social, cultural or spiritual reasons.

The Old Man's Valley Cemetery is of State significance for its social value as one of the most carefully conserved family cemeteries in NSW. Its considerable social significance to a wide array of Higgins family descendants (now living all over Australia) is evidenced by their work in funding its conservation over many years, accessing both professional advice and their own labour. More than 200 descendants gathered at the cemetery in 1990 to celebrate the bicentenary of Thomas Edward Higgins and Eleanor McDonald's arrival in Australia. Several Higgins family descendants continue to reside in the Hornsby district and conduct working-bees at the cemetery every three months which also serve as family reunions. The cemetery has also been a focus of wider community interest for some years, and is a focus of local heritage tours by visitors and educational institutions. It provides a sense of historic continuity and contributes to the community's sense of identity. It is of State significance as an exemplary example of how a small, isolated site of historical significance may be conserved and valued.

The place has potential to yield information that will contribute to an understanding of the cultural or natural history of New South Wales.

The Old Man's Valley Cemetery has local significance for its research potential to understand the living conditions, circumstances, values and genealogy of a pioneer family. The cemetery is an important genealogical resource, recording many individuals from the network of European families that inhabited in the valley. The conservation project of the 1990s also provides an example of community organisation of resources as well as conservation techniques applied to a small-scale family cemetery that may be measured over time for their effectiveness.

The place possesses uncommon, rare or endangered aspects of the cultural or natural history of New South Wales.

The Old Man's Valley Cemetery is of State significance as one of the few fully conserved family cemeteries in New South Wales. It is of local significance for its rarity in providing evidence of an isolated rural settlement pattern within Sydney region in this period, and as one of the few remnants of early European settlement in the Hornsby district. Dating from 1879 to 1931, it is also an unusually late private cemetery.

The place is important in demonstrating the principal characteristics of a class of cultural or natural places/environments in New South Wales.

The Old Man's Valley Cemetery is of local significance as a representative remnant of pioneering settler life that evidences the difficulties faced by early settlers as well as the close-knit family-based community which inhabited the valley. The cemetery also has representative significance at a local level for its landscape setting amid both remnant natural vegetation and traditional European grave plantings.

== See also ==
- List of cemeteries in New South Wales
