= Parramatta High School =

Location
- Great Western Highway, Parramatta, New South Wales; Australia; 33°49′03″S 150°59′51″E

Information
- Type: Government-funded co-educational dual modality partially academically selective and comprehensive secondary day school
- Motto: Latin: Fax Mentis Incendium Gloriaea (The torch of the mind lights the path to glory)
- Established: 1913; 113 years ago
- School district: Parramatta; Sydney metropolitan South
- Educational authority: New South Wales Department of Education
- Principal: David Arblaster
- Enrolment: ~1300
- Campus: Urban
- Colours: Royal blue, sky blue, grey, white
- Newspaper: Phoenix
- Website: parramatta-h.schools.nsw.gov.au

Parramatta High School (abbreviated as PHS and colloquially known as Parra High) is a government-funded co-educational dual modality partially academically selective and comprehensive secondary day school, located on the Great Western Highway in the central business district of Parramatta, a western suburb of Sydney, New South Wales, Australia.

Established in 1913, the school was the first co-educational school in the Sydney metropolitan area and was previously a fully selective high school. Since 2013, it has been partially selective in the Parramatta region with a high multicultural student base. The school is operated by the New South Wales Department of Education and has over 1000 students from Year 7 to Year 12. The school ranked 93rd in 2019 for the NSW Higher School Certificate.

== House system ==
At the beginning of Year 7, all Parramatta High students are placed in one of the following four houses:

House	Colour	Named after	Origin
Batman		John Batman	Adventurer who explored the Port Phillip Bay district of Victoria in 1835, discovering the Yarra River stating "This will be a place for a village". This village was to become Melbourne.
Brisbane		Sir Thomas Brisbane	Fair-minded Governor of NSW from 1821 to 1825 – most famous for allowing the first newspaper in the colony The Sydney Gazette to be free from government censorship.
Fitzroy		Charles Augustus Fitzroy	Governor of NSW from 1846, responsible for encouraging the rapid expansion of settlement until the gold era.
Marsden		Rev'd Samuel Marsden	The first chaplain of NSW – an astute businessman who contributed greatly to the colony's economic expansion.

Every year, there are two sporting carnivals which include athletics and swimming. There are two advanced carnivals, including zone and/or regional by which students compete to earn their house points. The winning house of each carnival and overall championship is announced each year.

== History ==
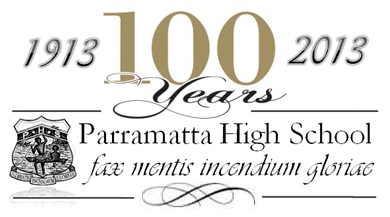

At a cost of A£13,000, Parramatta High School was officially opened by Campbell Carmichael, the Minister of Public Instruction, on Monday, 22 February 1913. In 2013 Parramatta High School celebrated its centenary, marking 100 years since its establishment on 28 January 1913. Class of 2018, the 100th cohort to enrol at Parramatta High School, acknowledged this by implementing the Phoenix on the back of their year 12 jerseys. The Phoenix is a well-known symbol of Parramatta High, which derived from the 1940s Phoenix Magazine, and is celebrated through the annual PHS Phoenix Week.

== Notable alumni ==
- John Benaud – cricketer
- Richie Benaud – cricketer
- Cardinal Edward Idris Cassidy – high-ranking Vatican official
- Philip K. Chapman – first Australian-born American Apollo astronaut
- Manu Crooks – musician
- Harry Hopman – tennis player
- Bede Morris – immunologist
- Ted Noffs – theologian
- Chips Rafferty – actor
- W. E. H. Stanner – anthropologist
- Rod Taylor – actor
- Sir Cyril Walsh – Justice of the High Court of Australia
- George Weir – judge & politician

== See also ==
- List of government schools in New South Wales
- List of selective high schools in New South Wales
- Selective school (New South Wales)
