= John Davies (archivist) =

Malaysian archivist, writer (1925–1999)

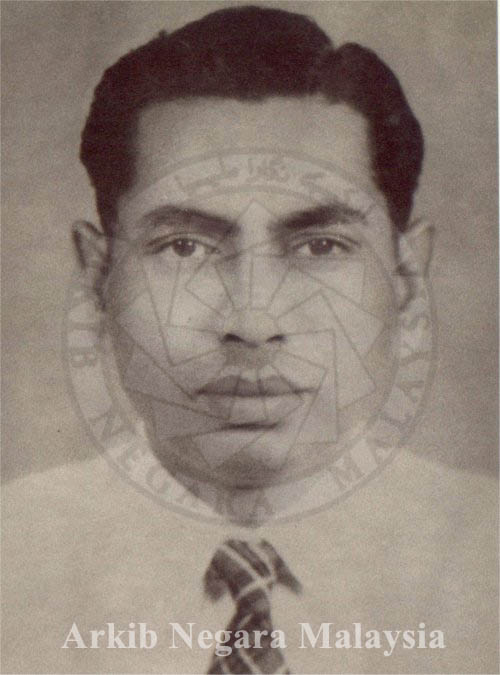
- Born: July 27, 1925; Parit Buntar, Perak, Malaysia
- Died: October 21, 1999 (aged 74); St Leonards, New South Wales, Australia
- Occupations: Archivist, writer
- Writing career
- Notable awards: Ahli Mangku Negara

John Davies A.M.N. P.P.N. (July 27, 1925 – October 21, 1999) was an archivist, writer, and recipient of the prestigious Ahli Mangku Negara award. He served as Executive Officer of the National Archives of Malaysia (Arkib Negara Malaysia), Petaling Jaya between the 1961 and 1977. He was the world's leading authority on the conservation and preservation of documents during his era.

== History ==
Davies was born in Parit Buntar, Perak, Malaysia to Joseph Sanghuni Nair and Marial Joseph, he was baptised as John Davies, and was of Indian Malayali Nair descent. During the Japanese occupation of Malaya in WWII Davies served as a rations officer. He later met Lord Mervyn Cecil Ffranck Sheppard (Tan Sri Mubin Sheppard), who had seen potential in Davies and offered him a junior position at the National Archives of Malaysia. Davies excelled in his profession, rose up the ranks and was promoted to Archives Executive Officer. Davies published several books and traveled overseas to England, where he studied and refined his art. Later on in his career Mr Davies was awarded the Ahli Mangku Negara award from the Raja of Selangor for his service at the Malaysian Archives. Being the world's leading figure on the subject of preservation, he was required to lecture on many occasions throughout Asia, Europe, Australia and Africa.

== Later life ==
During the 1980s John Davies migrated to Sydney, Australia and worked as a senior archivist at the Archives of New South Wales for several years.

== Family ==
Davies was married to Muriel Pavalam David. They had seven children and ten grandchildren.

== Death ==
In his later years, Davies lived on the Upper North Shore of Sydney, in the suburb of Hornsby, New South Wales. He died on October 21, 1999, at the Royal North Shore Hospital, St Leonards, at the age of 74.

== Honours ==
=== Honours of Malaysia ===
- Malaysia
  - Medallist of the Order of the Defender of the Realm (P.P.N.) (1965)
  - Member of the Order of the Defender of the Realm (A.M.N.) (1977)
