= Bede Morris =

Australian immunologist (1927–1988)

- Born: 10 June 1927; Hornsby, New South Wales, Australia
- Died: 2 July 1988 (aged 61); Fontainebleau, France
- Resting place: Canberra, Australia
- Scientific career
- Fields: Immunology

Bede Morris FAA (10 June 1927 – 2 July 1988) was an Australian immunologist. He was notable for his research into the lymphatic system, lipid metabolism, the immune system, and reproductive biology, and his pioneering use of sheep and cattle as experimental animals.

== Early life ==
Morris was born in Hornsby, New South Wales, the younger of two sons of Grainger and Evelyn Jean Morris née Chapple. His father died in 1930, and the family moved to Emu Plains to live with Evelyn's parents. Morris attended primary school in Emu Plains, then Penrith Intermediate School and Parramatta High School. At age 15 he won a scholarship to the University of Sydney, but was too young to enrol; instead he worked as a clerk at the Metropolitan Water, Sewerage and Drainage Board for a year, and then bred poultry.

In 1945, soon after turning 18, Morris enlisted in the Australian Imperial Force, but did not see active service, the war having ended while he was still in training. He was selected for officer training, but instead left the army to study veterinary science under the Commonwealth Reconstruction Training Scheme.

== Career ==
Morris studied veterinary science at the University of Sydney from 1947 to 1951, graduating as a Bachelor of Veterinary Science with first-class honours, and winning the STD Symons Prize and the University Medal.

After graduation, Morris choose to do research, and from 1952 to 1955 worked at the Kanematsu Memorial Institute of Pathology at Sydney Hospital, investigating the role of lymphatic vessels in restoring fluid balance. In 1956 he moved to England to work at the Sir William Dunn School of Pathology at the University of Oxford. His research on chylomicrons, presented as a thesis on "Factors concerned with lipid transport", earned him a Doctor of Philosophy in 1958.

In 1958 Morris returned to Sydney as a senior research fellow at the Kanematsu Institute for two months, before moving to Canberra to work in experimental pathology at the John Curtin School of Medical Research (part of the Australian National University). In 1963 he became a professorial fellow, and in 1970 the inaugural professor and head of the newly established Department of Immunology. He remained based at the Australian National University until his death in 1988, researching lymph flow, lipid metabolism, the immune system, and reproductive biology, and pioneering the use of sheep and cattle as experimental animals.

In 1960 Morris was a foundation councillor of the Australian Physiological and Pharmacological Society. In 1969 he was appointed a Fellow of the Australian Academy of Science and served on its council (1977–1980), as vice-president (1979–1980), and treasurer (1981–1985).

In 1965 Morris travelled to Paris on study leave, beginning a lifelong "love of France, its people, its culture". He was a frequent visitor to the country, where he worked in the Institut de Pathologie Cellulaire. He was a consultant to the French government, and in recognition of his contributions was awarded Chevalier dans l'Ordre national du Mérite, and (in May 1988) the Légion d'honneur.

Morris was also a member of the Australian Wool Board, chairman of the Reserve Bank's Rural Credits Development Fund, and a board member of the International Laboratory for Research on Animal Diseases.

Morris owned a property "Lockhart", near Canberra. He initially used it to farm Merino sheep for wool (1963 to 1968), and later for breeding Charolais cattle. He used artificial insemination with imported semen to introduce genetic material without the risk of importing diseases from other countries. Some of these animals were used in his work at the Australian National University.

== Personal life ==
Morris was married and had five children.

In 1986 he wrote a book on French photography, Images : illusion and reality, a catalogue to the exhibition of the same title. The exhibition was jointly sponsored by the Australian Academy of Science, the Academie de Sciences and the Societe francaise de photographie.

He died in a car accident on 2 July 1988 at Fontainebleau, while on study leave in France. His body was returned to Canberra, where he was cremated.

== Legacy ==
The Bede Morris Fellowship for Early Career Research is awarded annually by the Australian National University to an Australian scientist performing research in France.

The Bede Morris Memorial Refresher Course for Veterinarians at the University of Sydney (a course which Morris helped set up in 1978) was named in his memory after his death.
