= Hornsby, New South Wales =

Hornsby
- Suburb
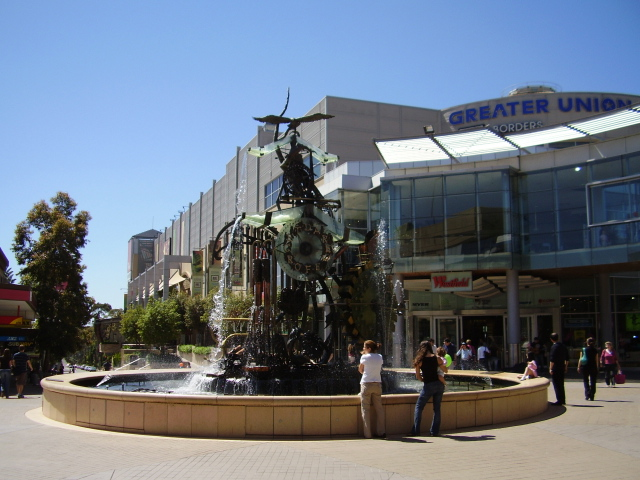
- Florence Street Mall with Hornsby Water Clock

- Interactive map of Hornsby
- Country: Australia
- State: New South Wales
- City: Sydney
- LGA: Hornsby Shire
- Location: 23 km (14 mi) north-west of Sydney CBD

Government
  - State electorates: Hornsby; Wahroonga
  - Federal division: Berowra
- Elevation: 188 m (617 ft)

Population
  - Total: 22,462 (2021 census)
- Postcode: 2077
Suburbs around Hornsby
Hornsby Heights	Asquith	North Wahroonga
Dural	Hornsby	Waitara
Westleigh	Normanhurst; Thornleigh	Wahroonga

Hornsby is a suburb on the Upper North Shore of Sydney in the state of New South Wales, Australia, approximately 23 kilometres (14 mi) north-west of the Sydney central business district. It is the administrative centre of the local government area of Hornsby Shire.

== History ==
The name Hornsby is derived from convict-turned-constable Samuel Henry Horne, who took part in the apprehension of bushrangers Dalton and MacNamara on 22 June 1830. In return he was granted land which he named Hornsby Place. The suburb of Hornsby was established on the traditional lands of the Dharug and Kuringgai people. There are more than 200 known Aboriginal sites in the Hornsby Shire.

The first European settler in the area was Thomas Higgins, who received a grant of land in Old Mans Valley. The Higgins family eventually established the private Old Man's Valley Cemetery, where family members were buried from 1879 to 1931. The cemetery still exists and is heritage-listed.

A railway station named "Hornsby Junction" opened on 17 September 1886 to the north of the town of Hornsby, which had developed on the site of Horne's grant. It formed the junction of the Northern and the North Shore line which were yet to be completed at that time. Hornsby station was one stop further south on the Northern Line. Due to confusion by commuters alighting at the incorrect station expecting to transfer to a connecting train, the old Hornsby station was renamed Normanhurst on 17 November 1898 after prominent local activist and engineer Norman Selfe, while the Hornsby Junction station assumed the current name of Hornsby.

The first Hornsby Post Office opened on 1 August 1864, and was renamed South Hornsby on 1 May 1900, the same day Hornsby Junction office near the railway station (open since 1887) was renamed Hornsby. The latter office remains open; the South Hornsby office was renamed Normanhurst in 1905.

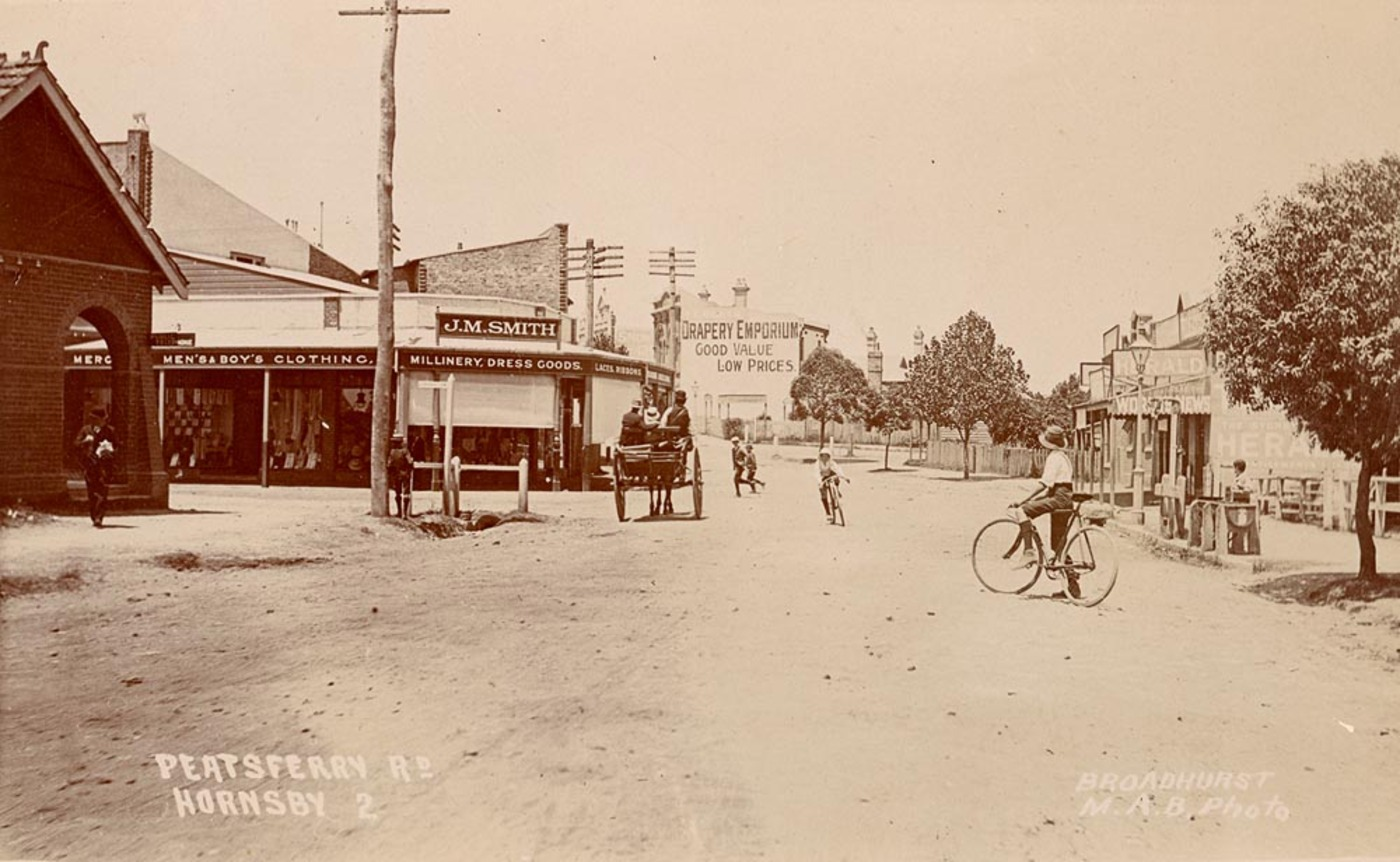
Peatsferry Road, early 1900s

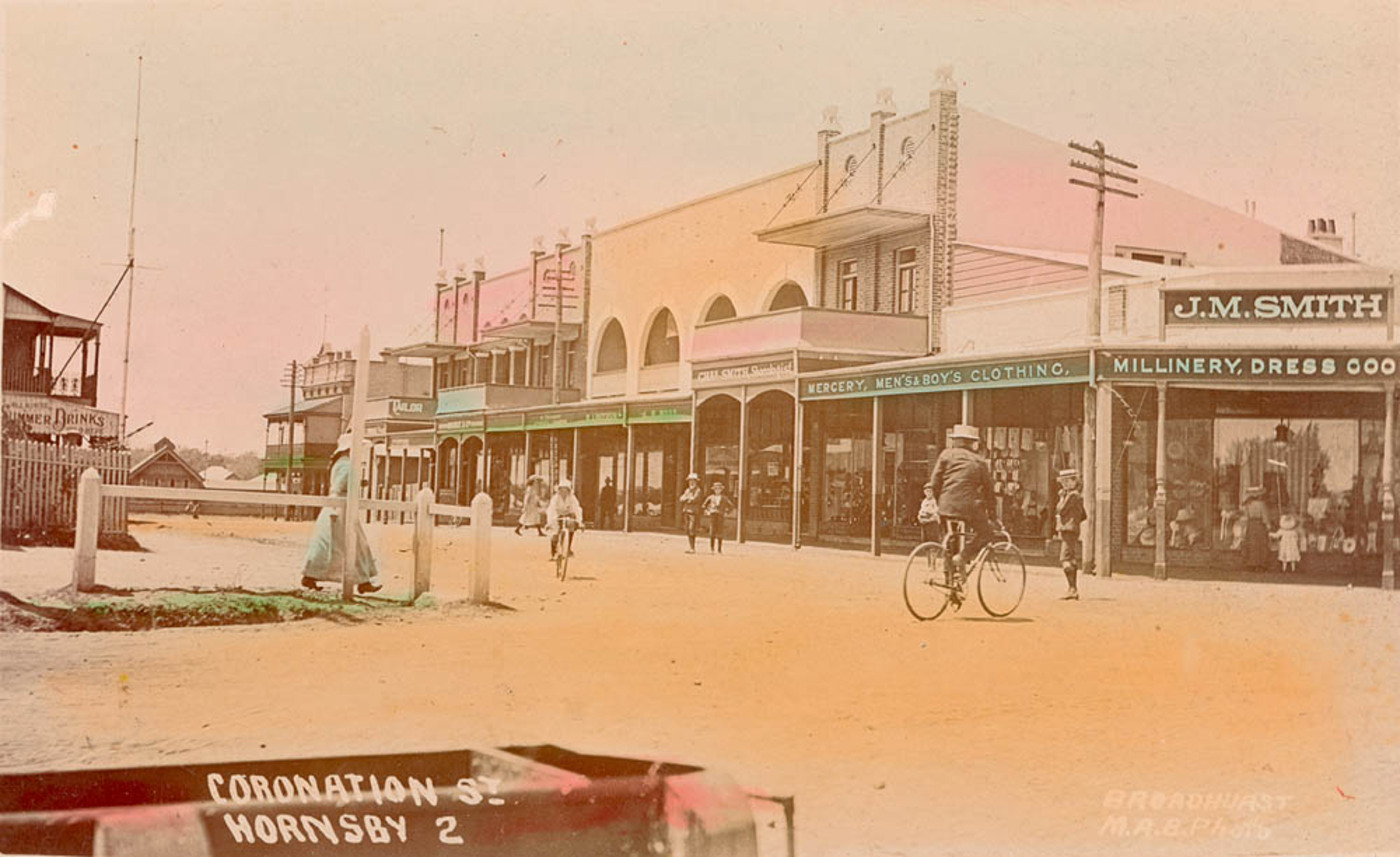
Coronation Street, early 1900s

Residential growth in the area was left to private developers, who acquired land both east and west of the railway station. Realizing that working class housing tended to be close to railway stations, the developers aimed at providing the middle classes with quality housing further from the station, in areas with views. One of the first purchasers of land in the area was Annie Roberts, wife of Oscar Garibaldi Roberts, who became one of the first councilors in the Hornsby Shire. Having acquired a property in Rosemead Road, the Roberts family built "Mount Errington", a spectacular mansion in the Arts and Crafts style, now heritage-listed. The Roberts family later acquired twelve blocks of land, which were then sub-divided into twenty-three blocks and offered for sale as the Roberts Mount Errington Sub-division. The area proceeded to grow as a prestige housing estate, featuring a number of houses in the Federation style. One of them was Birklands, a heritage-listed, Federation house built in 1902 in Dural Street. The house was originally built for Louis Spier Roberts and his wife Elizabeth, and stayed with the Roberts family until 1938.

The Hornsby Shire Council was established in 1906. In 1961, the Westfield Hornsby shopping mall opened, making it one of the first suburbs in Sydney with a modern-style shopping centre. A competing shopping centre, Northgate, opened in 1979 but was eventually bought by Westfield. In late 1999, the two sites were amalgamated when the original Westfield was demolished and Northgate was renovated to create the new Westfield Hornsby which opened in November 2001.

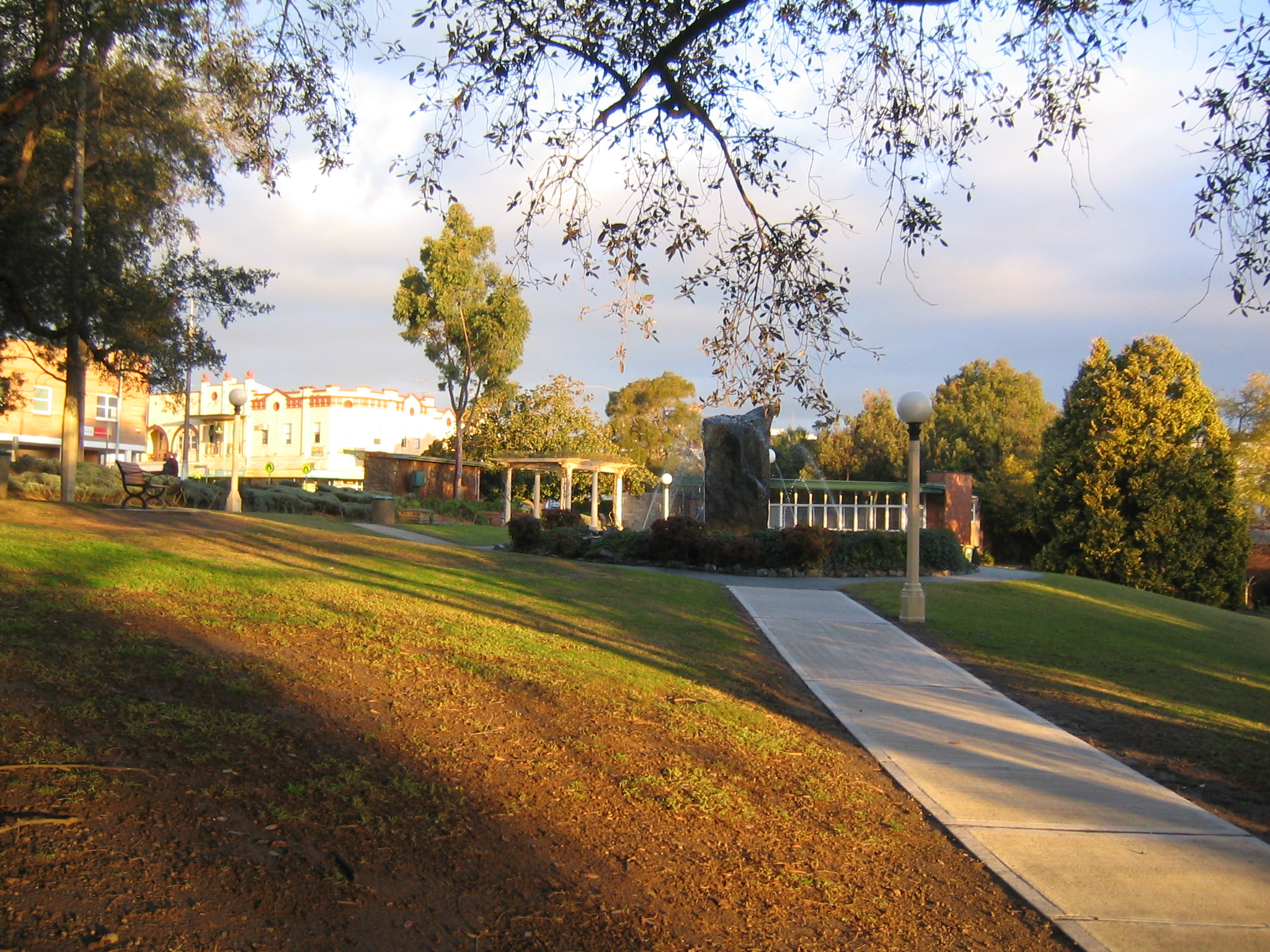
Hornsby Park

== Landmarks ==
- Hornsby Water Clock
- Odeon Cinema, Pacific Highway
- Hookhams Corner is the junction between the Pacific Highway, Carrington Road, Galston Road (which goes to Galston) and Old Berowra Road. It is also the name of an unbounded locality encompassing the area, as well as the site of two large water storage tanks that supply the surrounding area. It is at 33°41′29″S 151°05′55″E
- Hornsby RSL Club
- The Leonard House, former home of writer and advocate Geofferey Leonard

== Heritage listings ==
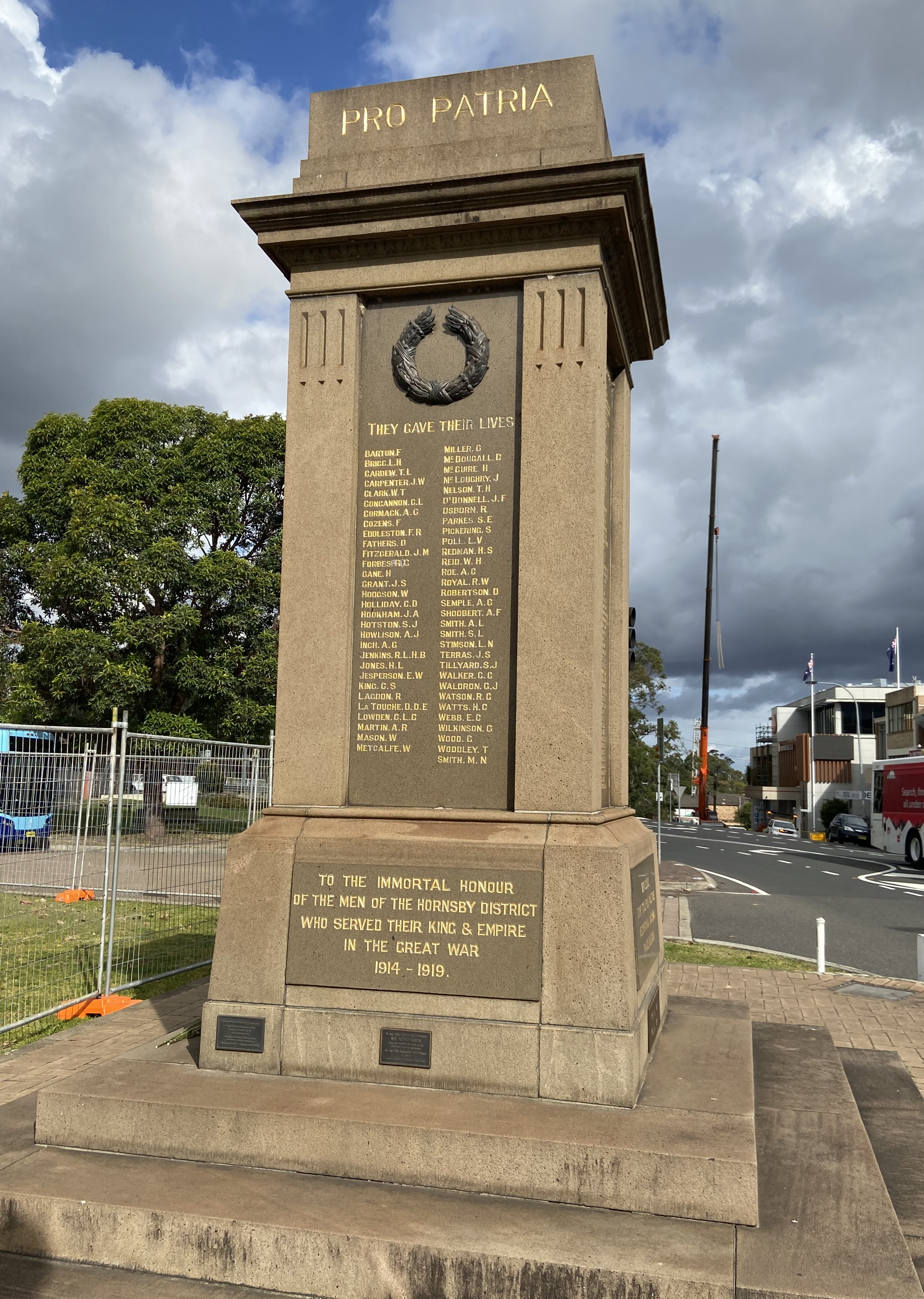
Hornsby War Memorial

Hornsby has a number of items listed on the New South Wales State Heritage Register or the Local Government Heritage List:

- Edgeworth David's House and Grounds
- Mount Wilga House
- Old Man's Valley Cemetery
- Hornsby Quarry
- Hornsby Court House, Pacific Highway
- Hornsby Shire Council Chambers, Pacific Highway
- Hornsby War Memorial, Pacific Highway
- Brinawa, William Street
- Mount Errington, Rosemead Road, spectacular mansion in the Arts and Crafts style, associated with the Roberts family
- Birklands, Dural Street, Federation home associated with the Roberts family
- Kuranda, Rosemead Road

== Transport ==
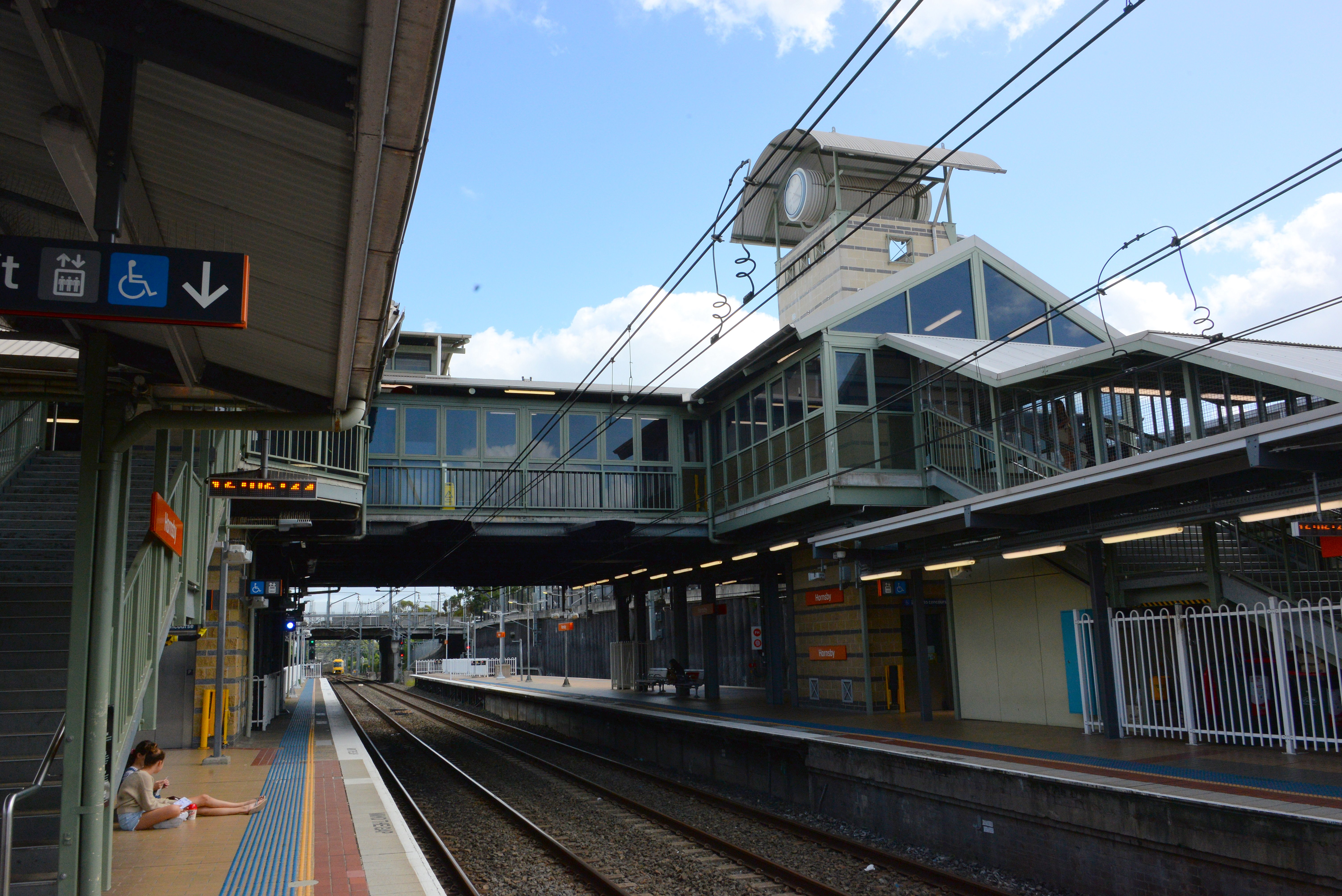
Hornsby railway station

Hornsby is 25 kilometres (16 mi) by train and about 24 kilometres (15 mi) by road from the Sydney central business district. Hornsby railway station is the junction of the North Shore and the Northern railway lines and is a hub for some services and is connected via bridge to Westfield. There are frequent railway services to the central business district via Strathfield or via Gordon. Intercity and regional trains also stop at Hornsby on the way to the Central Coast, Newcastle and further north.

Bus services operate from Hornsby Station Interchange. Services are operated by CDC NSW. to local residential areas including Hornsby Heights, Westleigh, Normanhurst, Thornleigh, Wahroonga, Warrawee, Turramurra and St Ives

CDC NSW operates two cross regional services from the Hornsby Interchange with;

- 575 to Macquarie University via Wahroonga, Turramurra, Pymble, Macquarie Park and Macquarie Centre
- 590 to Pennant Hills station

Hornsby Interchange is served by two NightRide bus routes with:

- Route N80 - to Town Hall via Strathfield operated by Busways
- Route N90 - to Town Hall via Chatswood operated by Busways

The Pacific Highway, which passes through Hornsby, was formerly the main road link between Sydney and north-eastern Australia. The completion of the Pacific Motorway (M1), which has its southern end at the neighbouring suburb of Wahroonga, means that the heavy traffic now bypasses the already busy Hornsby town area.

In October 2020, the northernmost section of the NorthConnex tunnel also located in close proximity to Hornsby in the neighbouring suburb of Wahroonga was opened.

The opening of the NorthConnex was a key missing link to the Sydney Motorway network and its opening provides direct connectivity from the M1 to the Sydney orbital motorway network through a direct underground connection to the M2 and M7 motorways and beyond. The tunnel also provides an alternate route to the Sydney CBD, Ryde area and Eastern and Inner West suburbs via the Lane Cove Tunnel, bypassing the congested Pennant Hills Road and Pacific Highway.

== Commercial areas ==
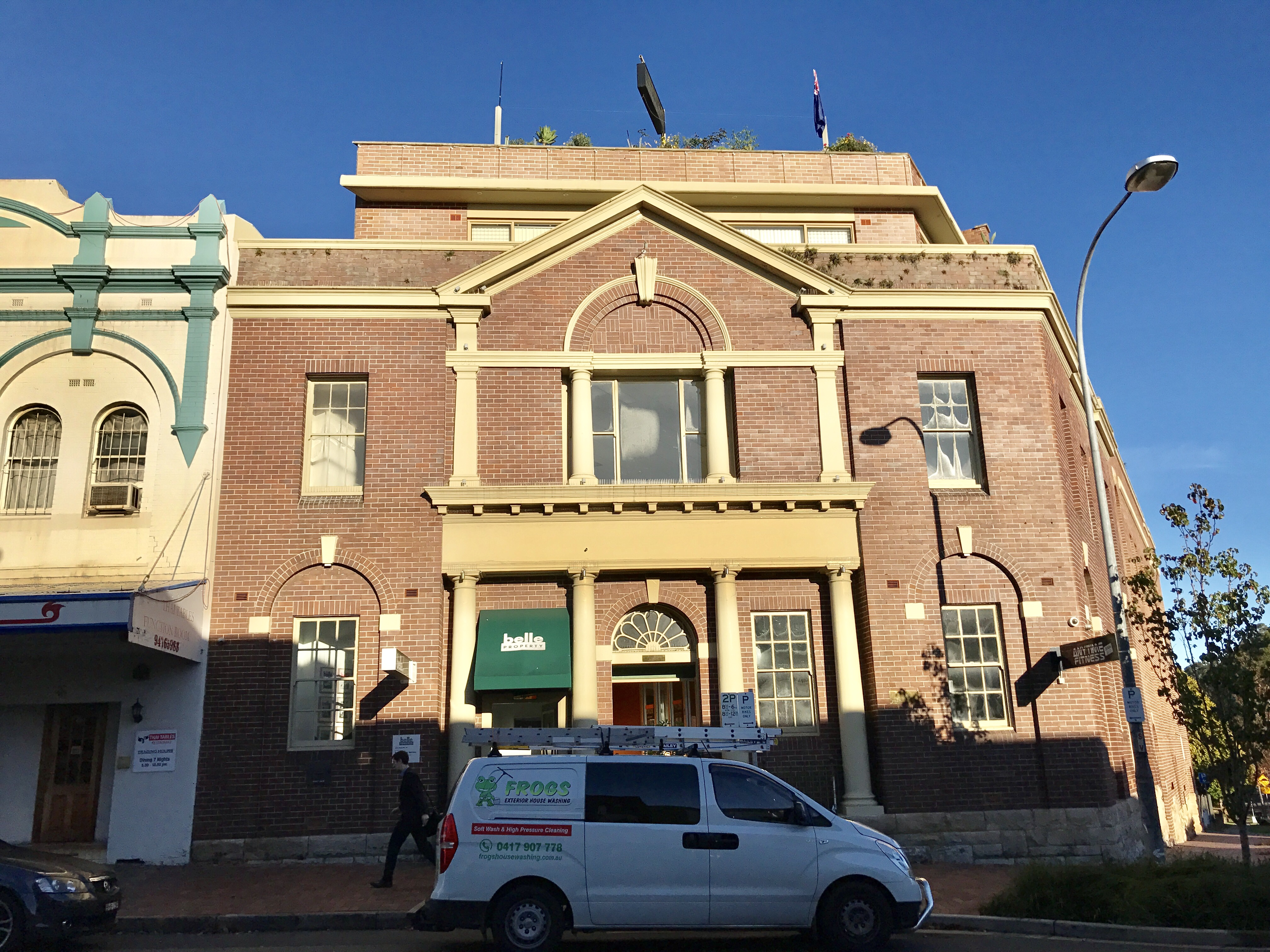
Buildings on Peats Ferry Road, the historic high street of the area

Hornsby remains a busy commercial centre, just as it was a century ago. Over the years, the town centre has developed distinct characteristics on either side of the railway line.

The western side consists of a traditional high street shopping village along the Old Pacific Highway. A short section of the highway north of the shops still has several antique lamp posts preserved. On the eastern side of the highway from south to north are the police station, the court house and the historic Hornsby Shire Council chamber (built in two stages in 1915 and 1930). On the western side is Hornsby Park with the new Hornsby Aquatic Centre complex and also Hornsby TAFE. A large war memorial and the adjacent RSL Club is located at the southern end of the shops.

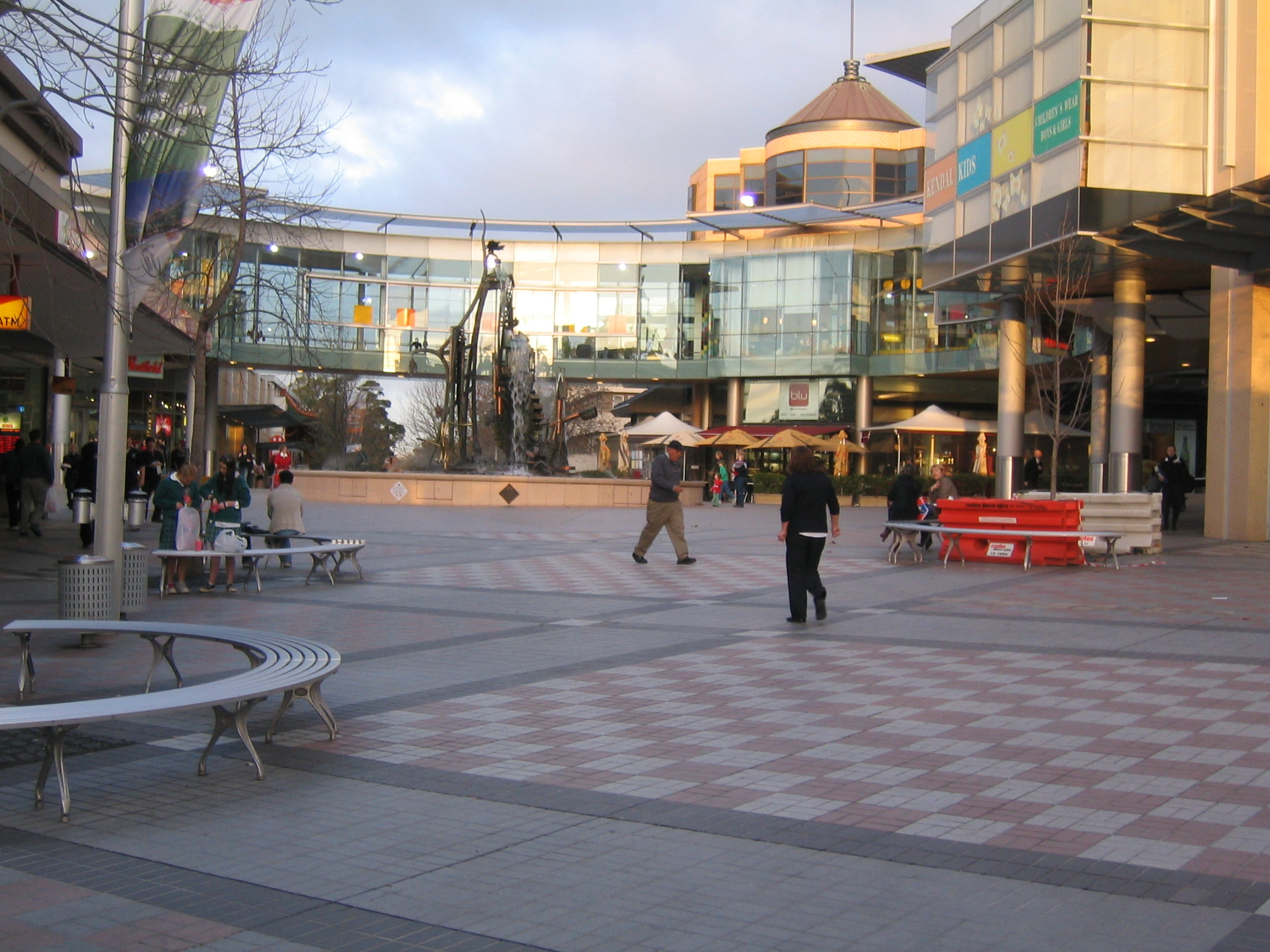
Florence Street and Westfield Hornsby

The eastern side is dominated by Westfield Hornsby, a shopping centre, which features a David Jones department store, an Event Cinemas multiplex, 335 stores, a food court and several restaurants. The intersection of Florence Street and Hunter Street became a pedestrian mall in the early 1990s. At the centre of the pedestrian mall is a large water clock sculpture, designed by Victor Cusack. The public library, Hornsby Shire Library, is also located in this area.

The north-western side of the suburb is occupied by various industries and the northern end of Hornsby features a major railway workshop.

== Residential areas ==
Residential areas, consisting of low-to-medium density housing, are located on both sides of the railway line. Many of the residential areas on the western side of the train line enjoy bushy surrounds and close proximity to Regional and National Parks, as well as the beautiful Lisgar Gardens.

In recent years, high-rise apartments have been constructed adjacent to the train line as part of the NSW state planning policies to allow medium to high density development along transport corridors.

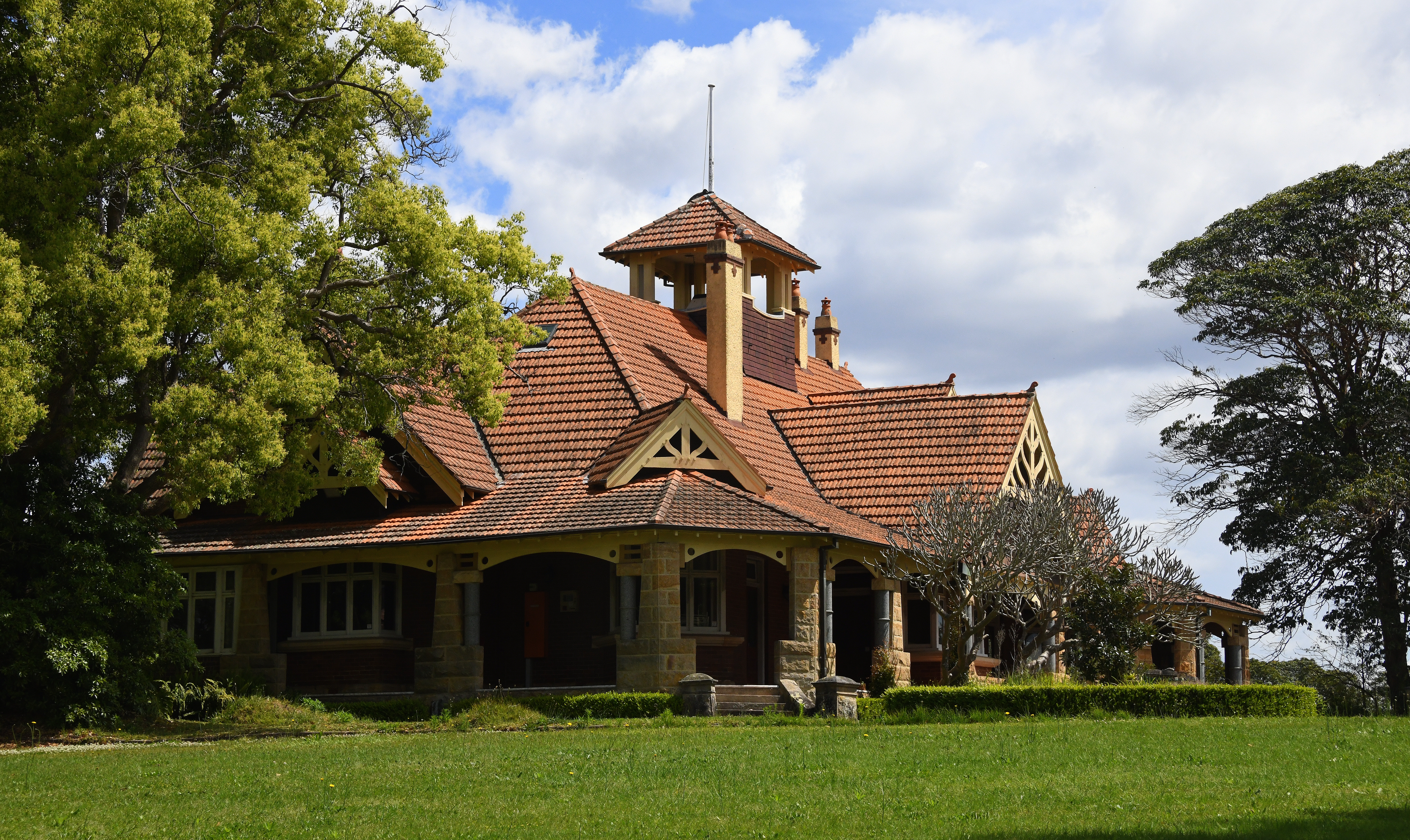
Mount Wilga House, a Queen Anne style residence completed in 1914

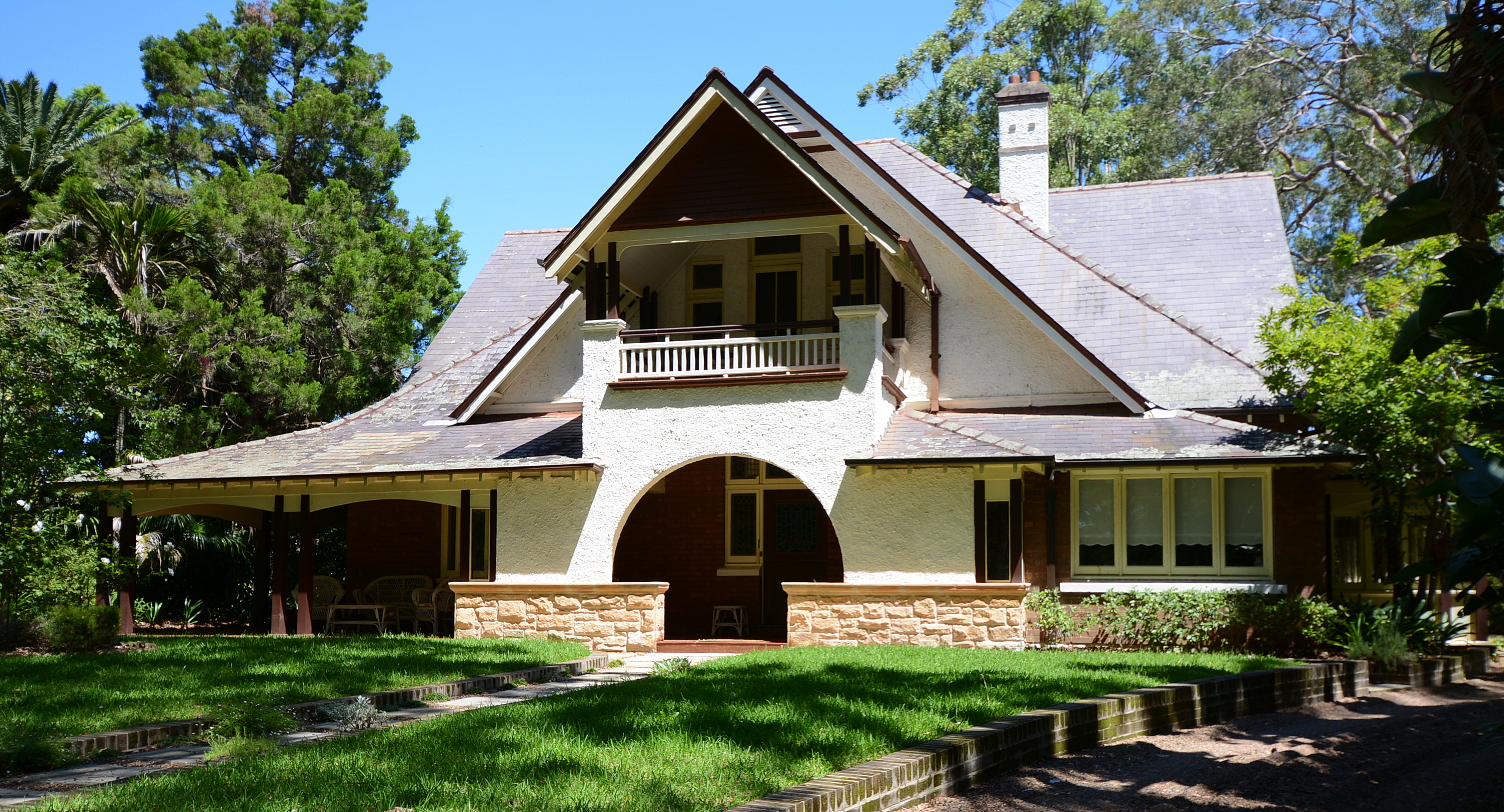
Mount Errington, an Arts and Crafts style house built in 1898

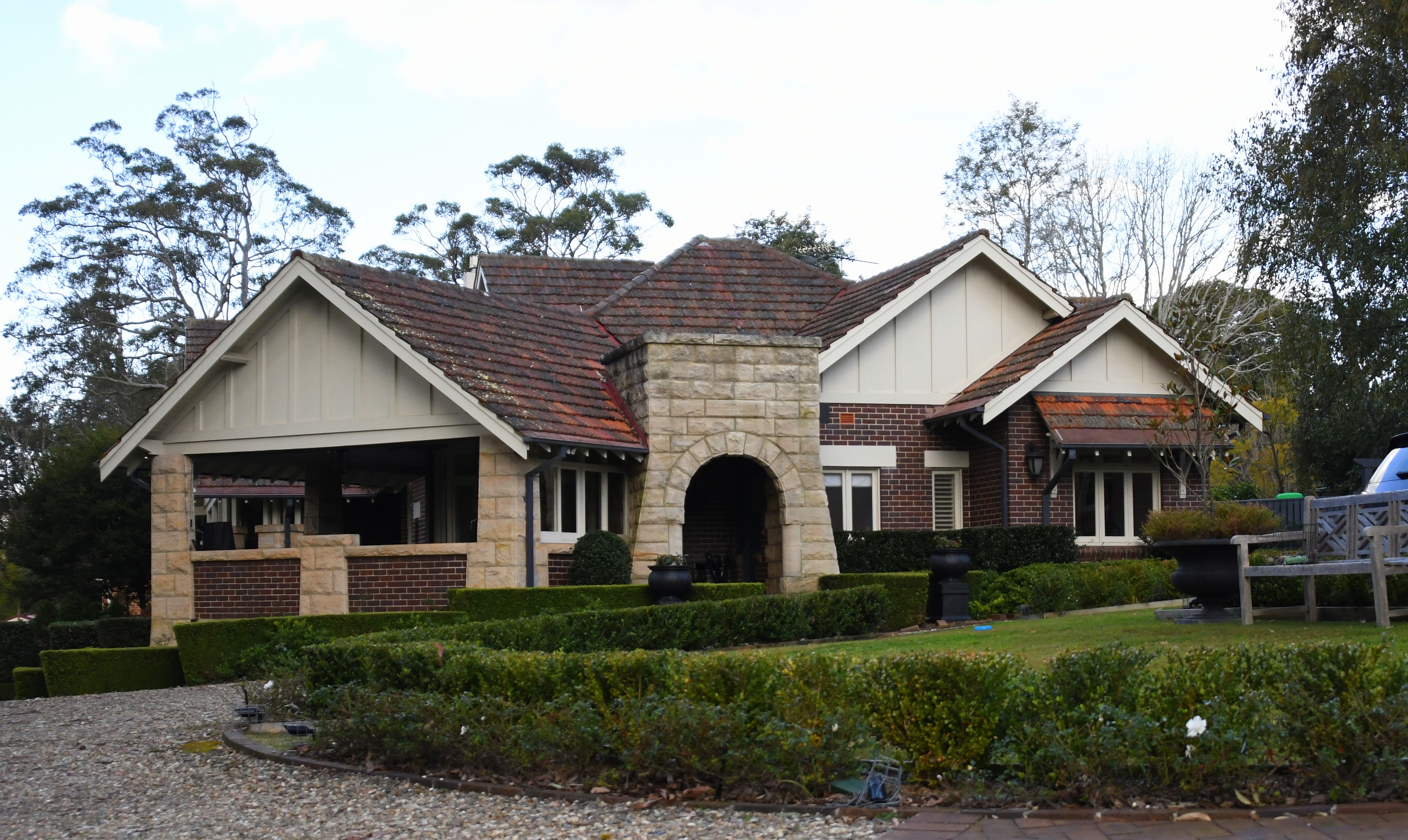
An Arts and Crafts style house

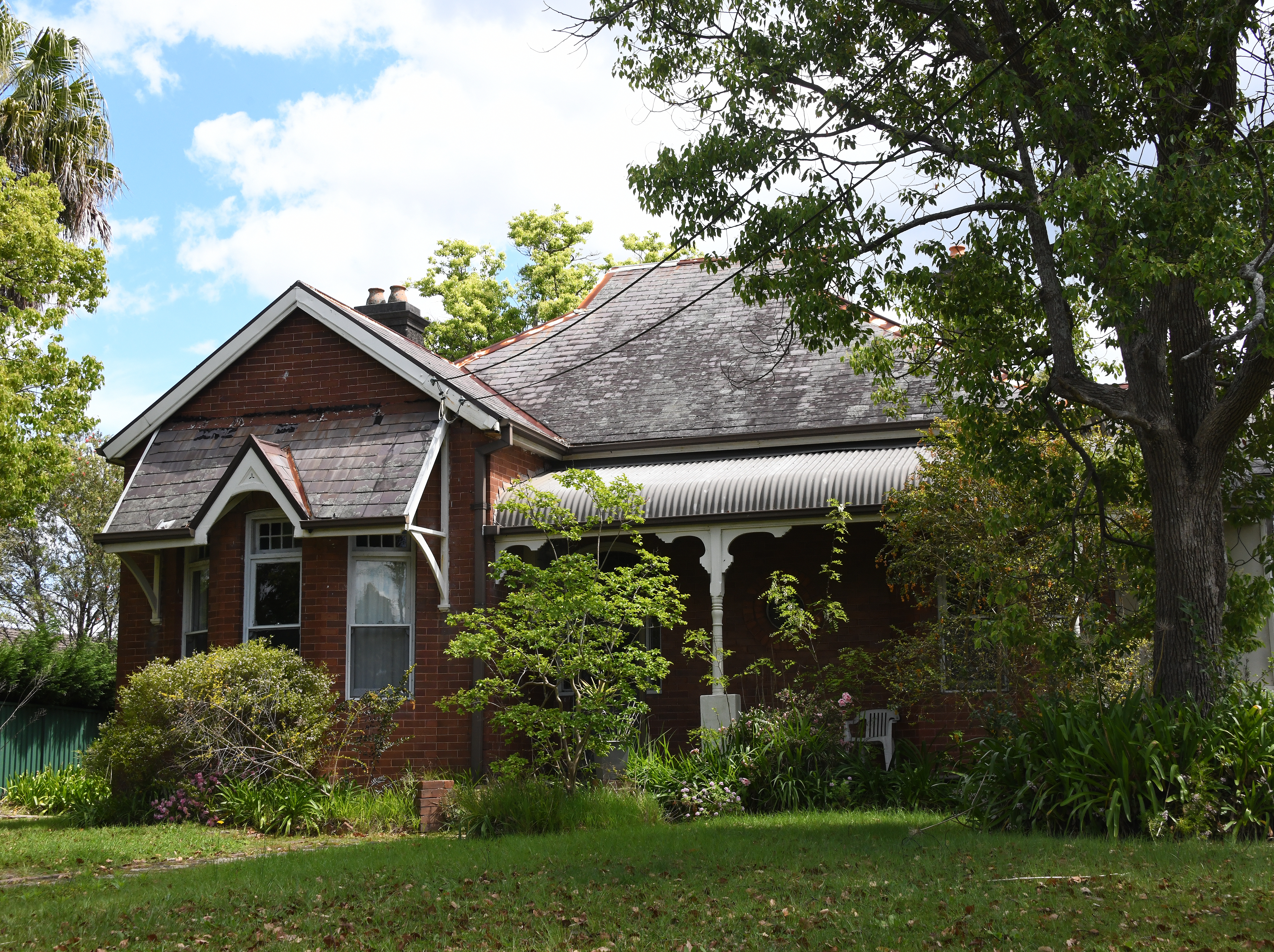
A Federation style cottage

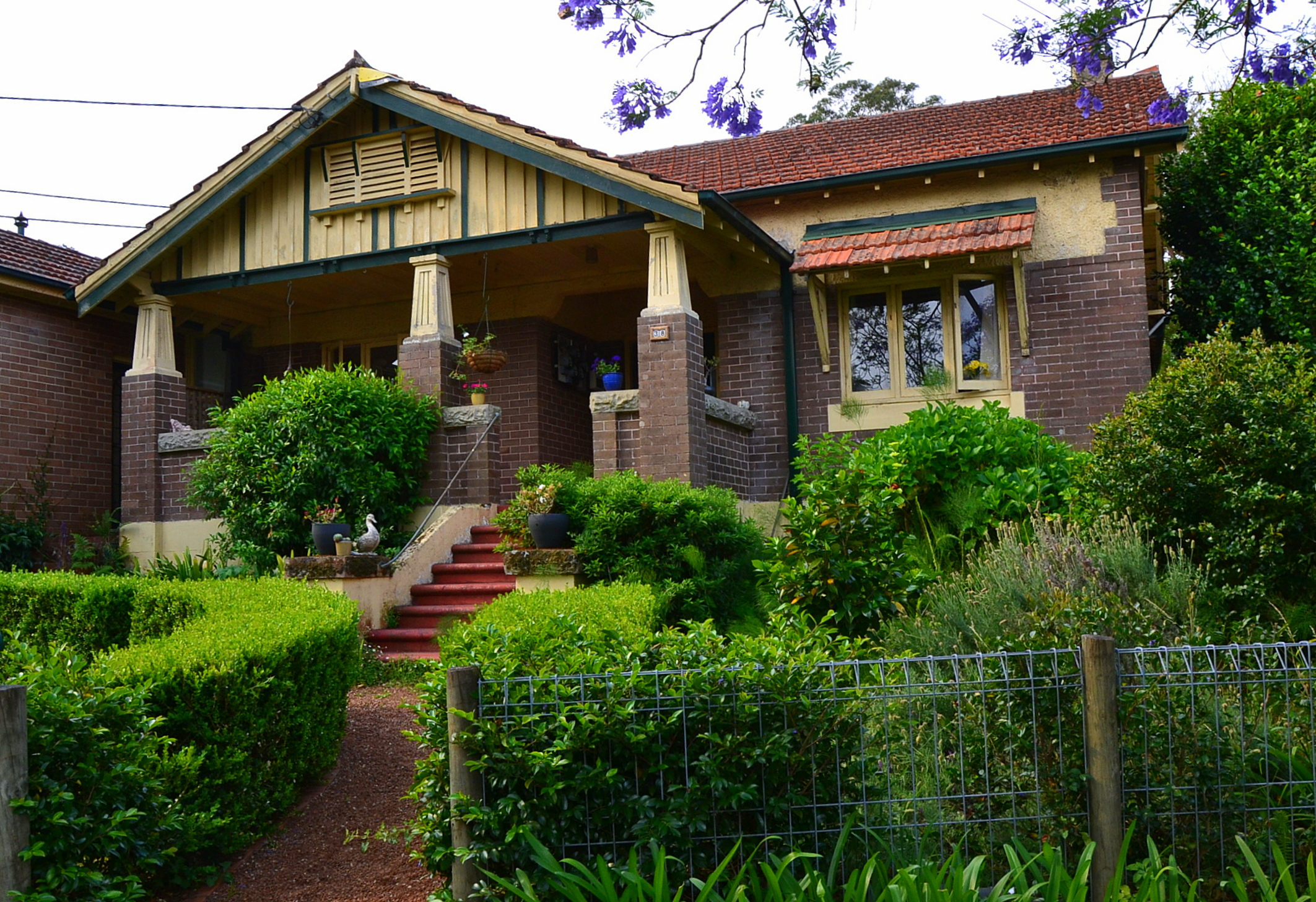
California bungalow on William Street

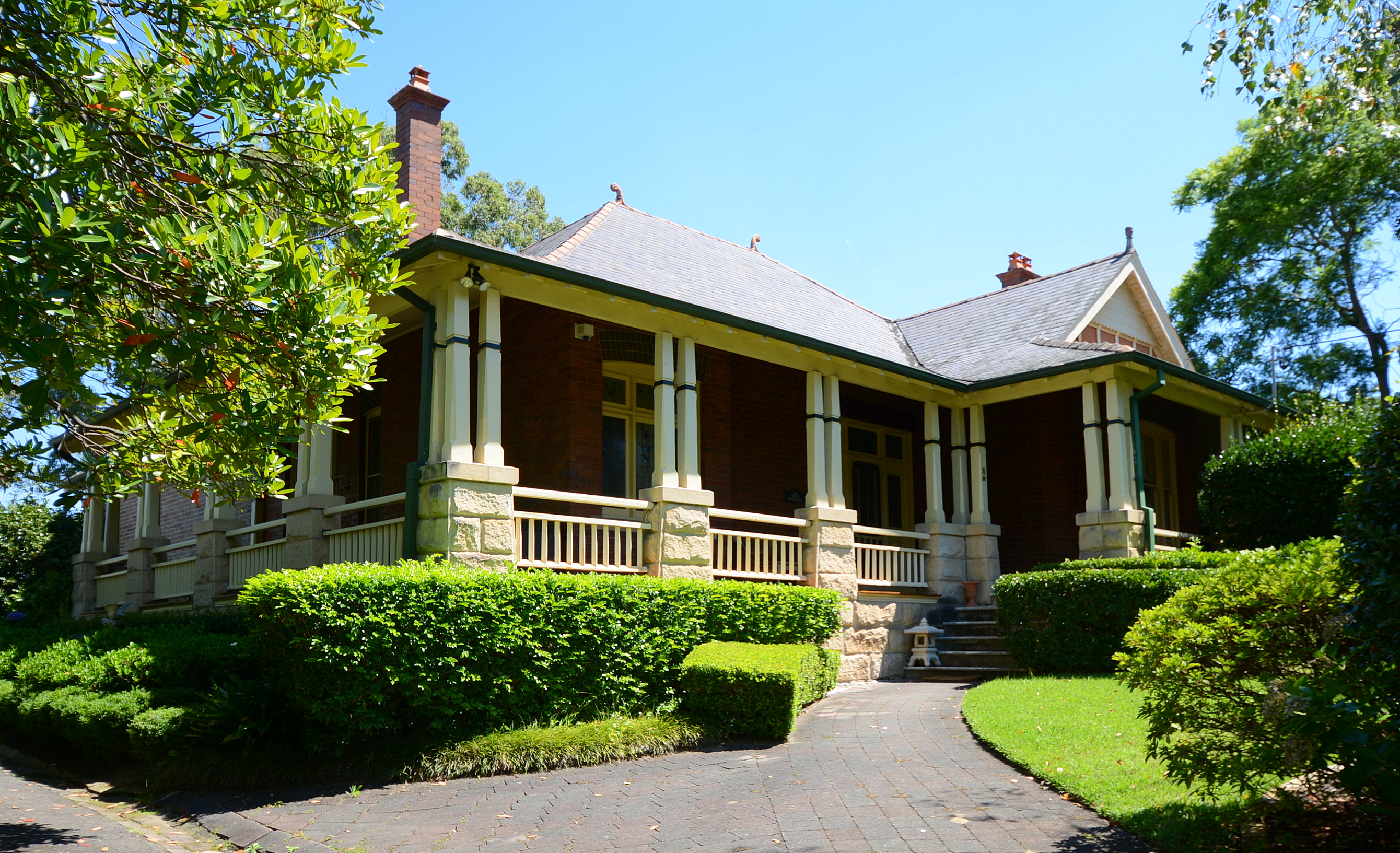
Warrina, Dural Street

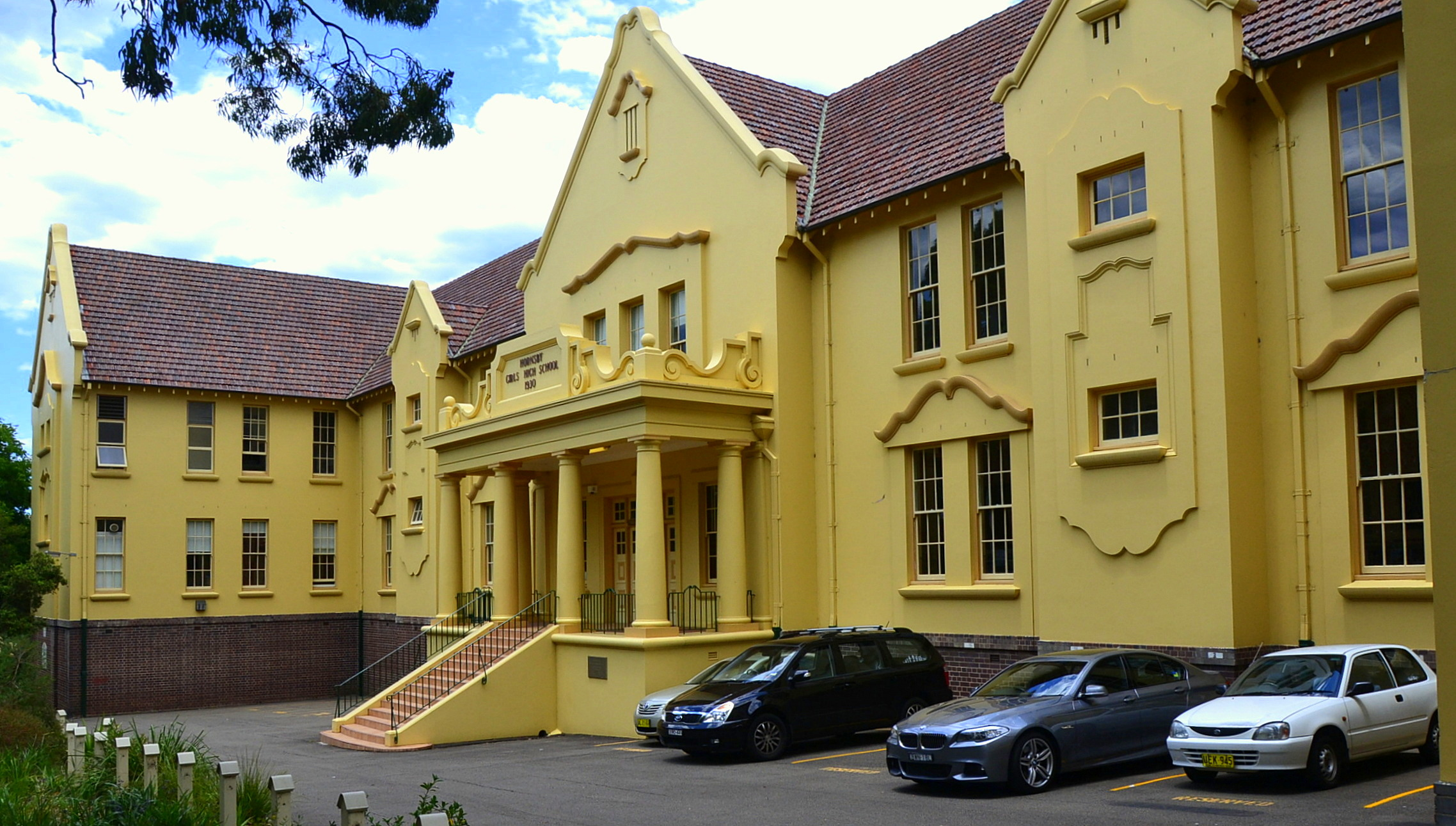
Hornsby Girls' High School

== Schools ==
Hornsby is home to a number of schools, including primary schools Hornsby North Public School, Hornsby South Public School, Hornsby Heights Public School and Clarke Road Special School and the secondary schools Barker College and Hornsby Girls' High School, which is a selective school. There is also a TAFE College at the north-western side of Hornsby.

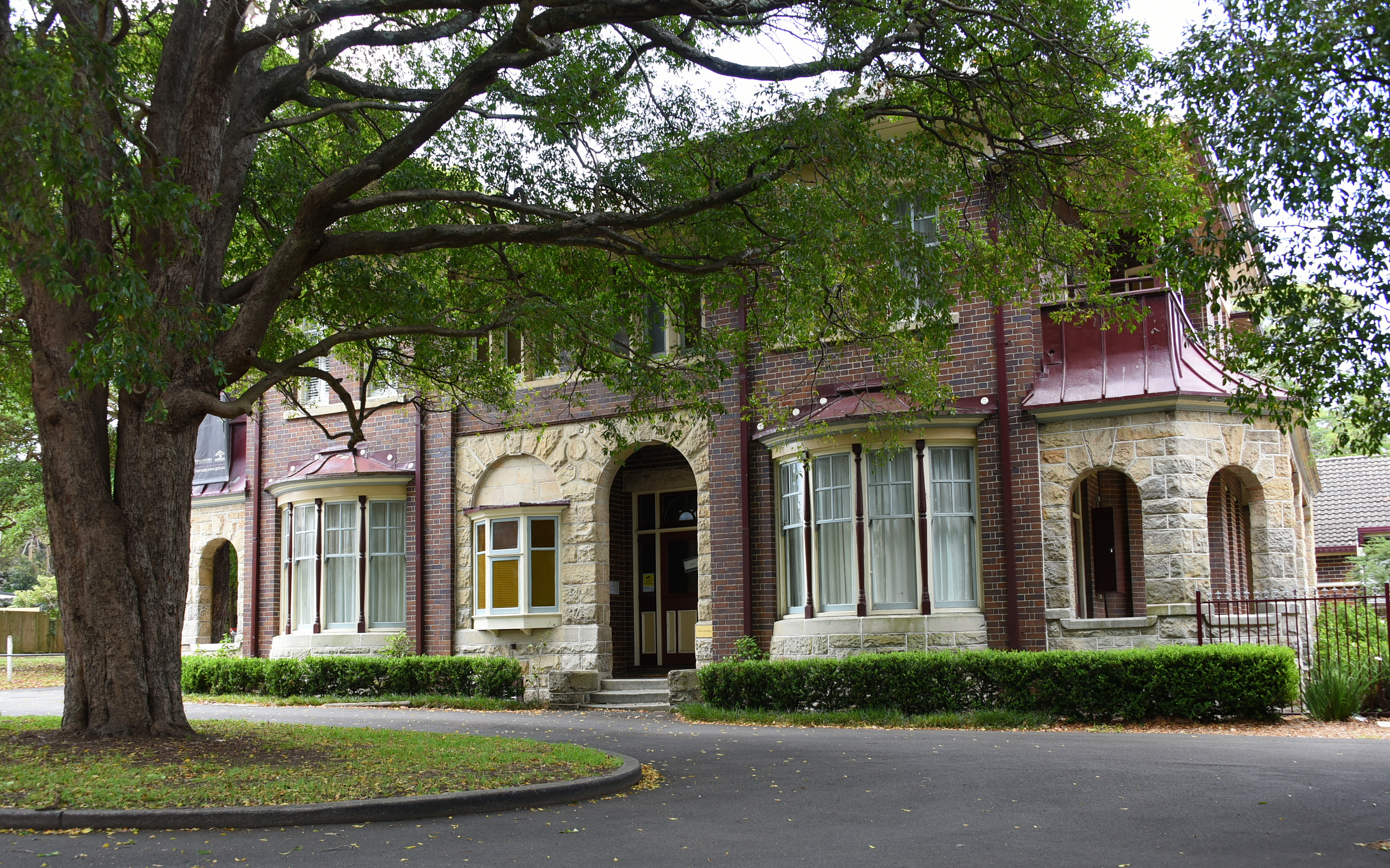
The heritage-listed Wallarobba house, now an arts and cultural centre

== Culture ==
Hornsby has long been associated with Ginger Meggs, a cartoon by Jimmy Bancks who grew up in Hornsby, which has appeared in Australian newspapers since 1921.

The local newspaper that serves the area is the Hornsby and Upper North Shore Advocate, owned by the Cumberland Newspaper Group.

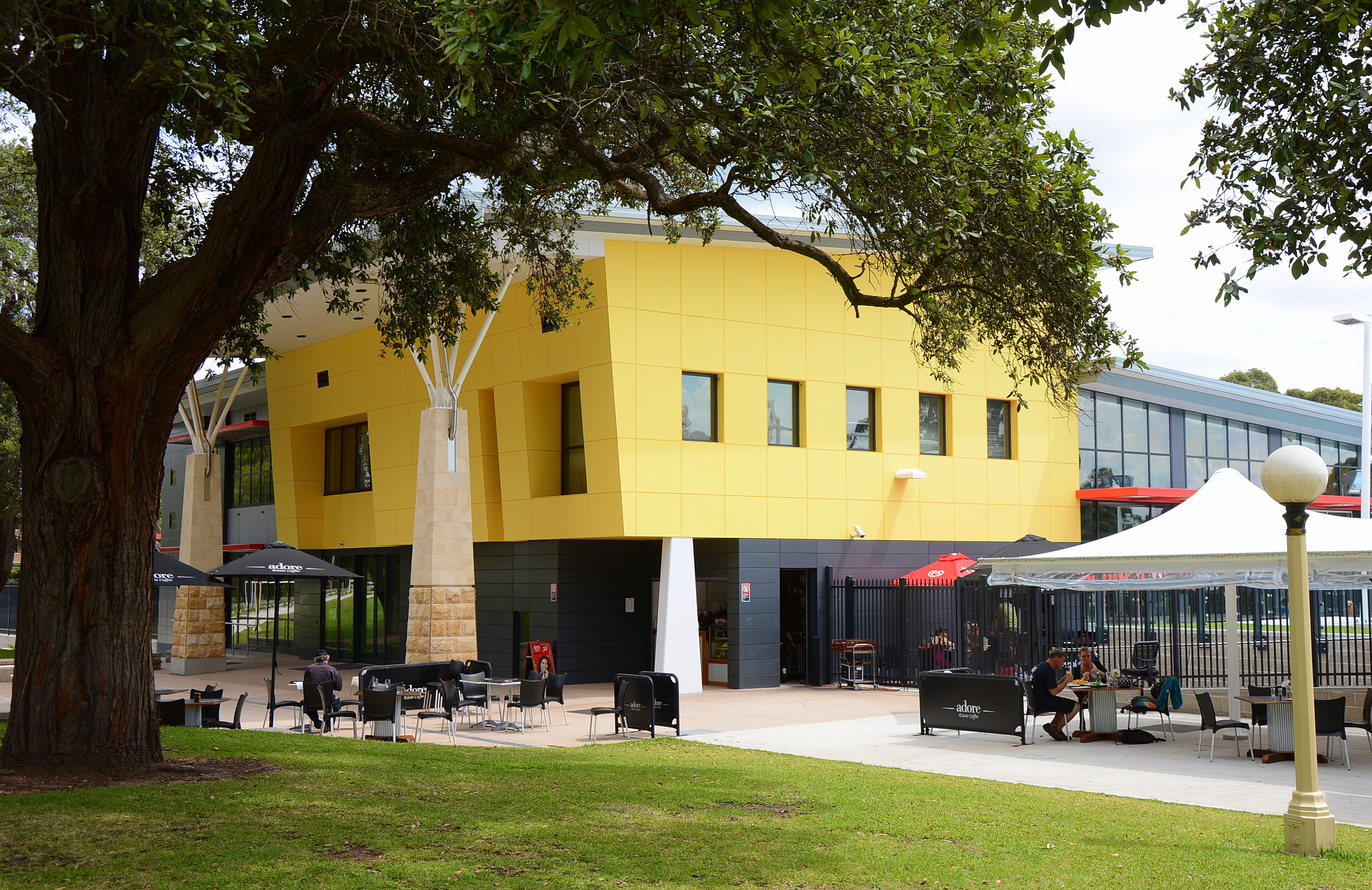
Hornsby Aquatic Centre

== Hornsby Aquatic Centre ==
Hornsby Aquatic Centre, which was built in 1962, had reached the end of its safe working life, and was closed on Friday 24 December 2010. It had featured a fifty-metre pool with 8 lanes and a small twelve-metre pool, also with 8 lanes. A new pool was built and opened on 11 August 2014.

== Parks and gardens ==
=== Edgeworth David Garden ===
The scientist and explorer Edgeworth David lived in Hornsby towards the end of his life. His house, known as Coringah, was set well back from Burdett Street on a mixed bushland property that extended along Sherbrook Road between Burdett and Northcote Road, and included a large garden. This property had originally been obtained in 1901 by Edward Swain, who built the cottage that still stands. The property was purchased by Edward Lear in 1916 and then by Edgeworth David in 1920. David's wife continued to live there after his death in 1934.

After David's death, subsequent owners preserved the garden, until Hornsby Shire Council acquired the entire property in 1999, adding the grounds (as Neal Park) to its Bushcare program. That same year, the entire property was added to the New South Wales State Heritage Register, listed as Edgeworth David's House and Grounds. Since 2016, the Edgeworth David Community Garden is located on the grounds.

=== Lisgar Gardens ===
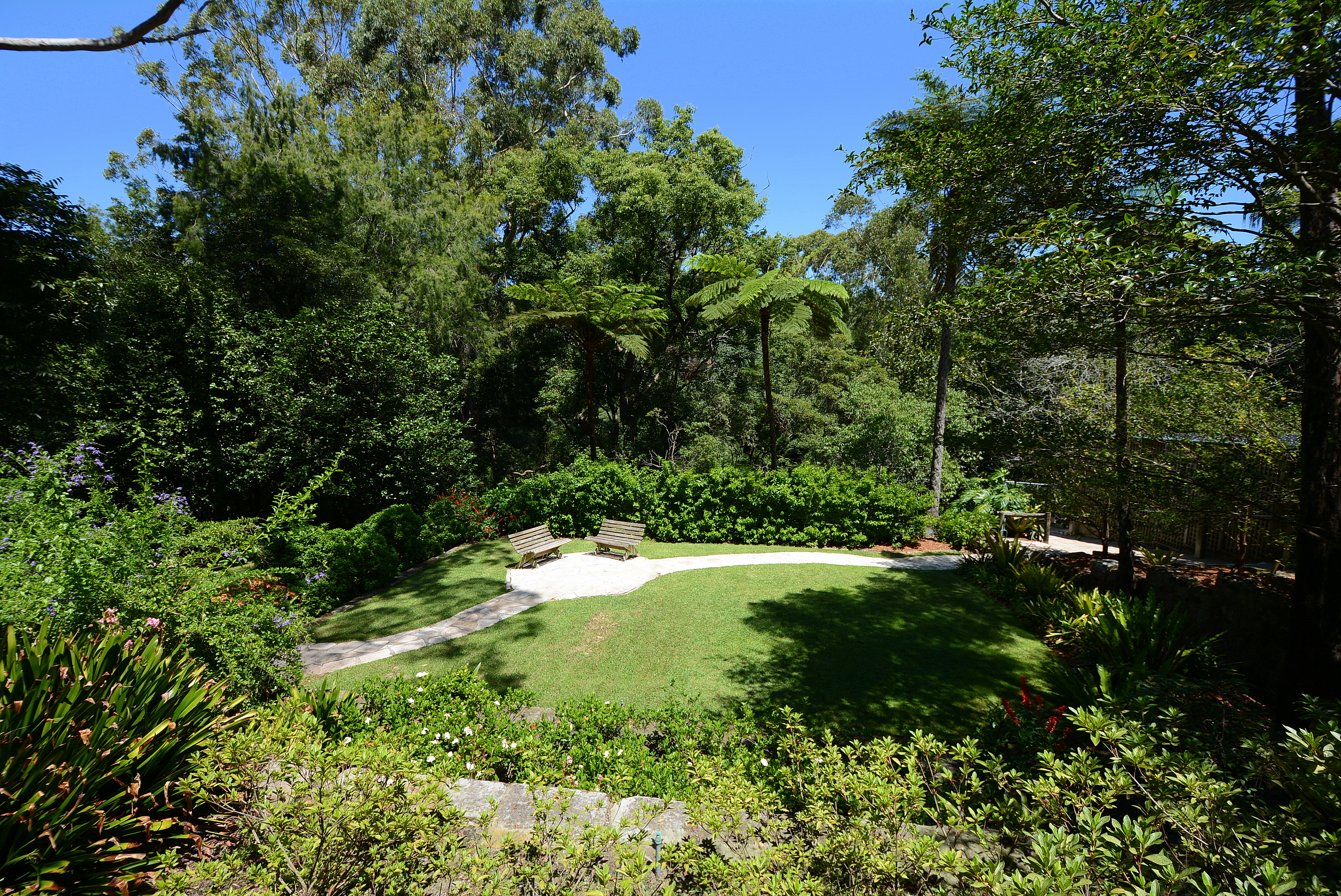
Lisgar Gardens

Lisgar Gardens are located in Lisgar Road, west of the Pacific Highway. The gardens were created by Max Cotton, who lived in Lisgar Road. In 1920, Cotton purchased land from his brother Leo and began developing the gardens for his own interest and satisfaction. With these gardens, Cotton could indulge his interest in horticulture and genetics. Aided by friends and family, he created extensive gardens and fishponds on the natural bushland that sloped down from Lisgar Road.

Cotton became friends with Professor Eben Gowrie Waterhouse—owner of Eryldene in the suburb of Gordon—and the two spent much time together, sharing an interest in camellias. By the mid-1960s, Cotton's health was failing after forty-five years of working on the gardens, and they were acquired by Hornsby Council. They were officially opened to the public on 21 September 1968. They are heritage-listed.

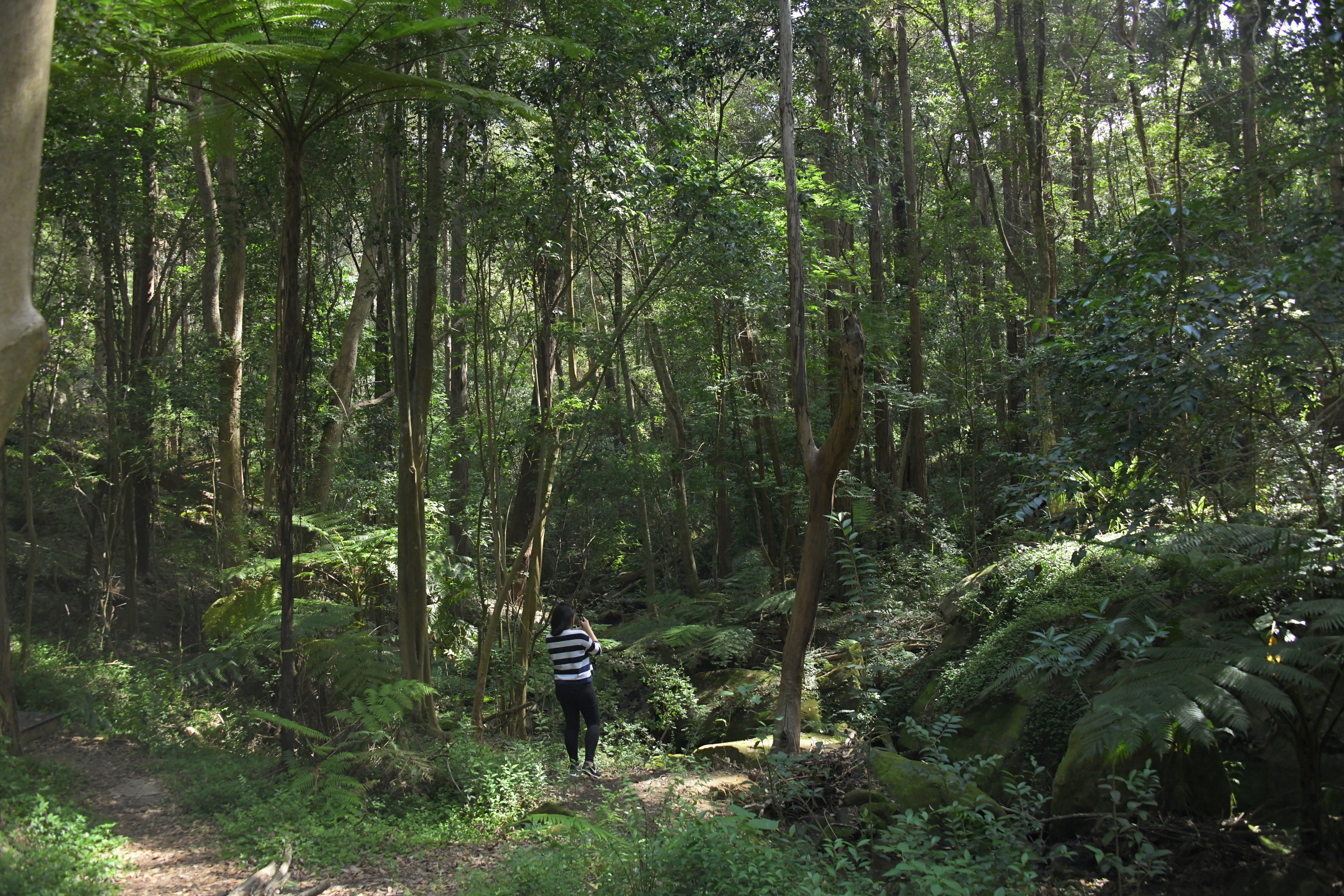
Florence Cotton Park

=== Florence Cotton Park ===
This park consists of a stretch of natural bushland between Frederick Street and Lisgar Gardens. Jimmy Bancks Creek runs through the park. Birdlife is varied and includes currawongs and brushturkeys. Hornsby Council has constructed a walking track that goes from Frederick Street to Lisgar Gardens. The park is named after Florence Cotton, wife of Leo Cotton, and was part of their estate. Florence Street in Hornsby was also named after her.

=== Ginger Meggs Park ===
This park is located in Valley Road and is named after Ginger Meggs, a comic-strip character created by the Australian cartoonist Jimmy Bancks. Bancks spent much time in the area around this park during his childhood, so Hornsby Council named it after his famous character Ginger Meggs. A nearby creek was named Jimmy Bancks Creek. The park was officially named Ginger Meggs Park during a formal naming ceremony by the mayor of Hornsby, John Muirhead, on 26 July 1997.

=== Hornsby Quarry ===
The quarry, located at the end of Quarry Road Hornsby, was partially filled, to make it safe, using excavated material from the NorthConnex tunnel which was built by the NSW Government and completed in 2020, to link the M1 and M2 motorways. For geological reasons the quarry has been nominated as State Heritage. The Quarry project was completed in the first quarter of 2019. A$50 million state budget will be allocated to turn the quarry into a future recreational park.

== Population ==
Historical population
Year	Pop.	±%
2001	18,276	—
2006	18,702	+2.3%
2011	19,863	+6.2%
2016	22,168	+11.6%
2021	22,462	+1.3%

In the 2021 Census, there were 22,462 people in Hornsby. Of these, 49.2% were male and 50.8% were female. The median age of people in Hornsby was 38 years. The most common ancestries in Hornsby were Chinese 23.3%, English 20.0%, Australian 17.7%, Indian 6.6% and Irish 5.8%. 44.7% of people were born in Australia. The most common countries of birth were China 12.6%, India 5.7%, Nepal 4.4%, South Korea 2.8% and England 2.8%. 45.3% of people only spoke English at home. Other languages spoken at home included Mandarin 14.5%, Cantonese 5.2%, Nepali 4.6%, Korean 3.4% and Hindi 2.3%. The most common responses for religion in the Census were No Religion 38.7%, Catholic 15.8%, Hinduism 9.9%, Anglican 8.1% and Not stated 5.3%.

== Notable residents ==
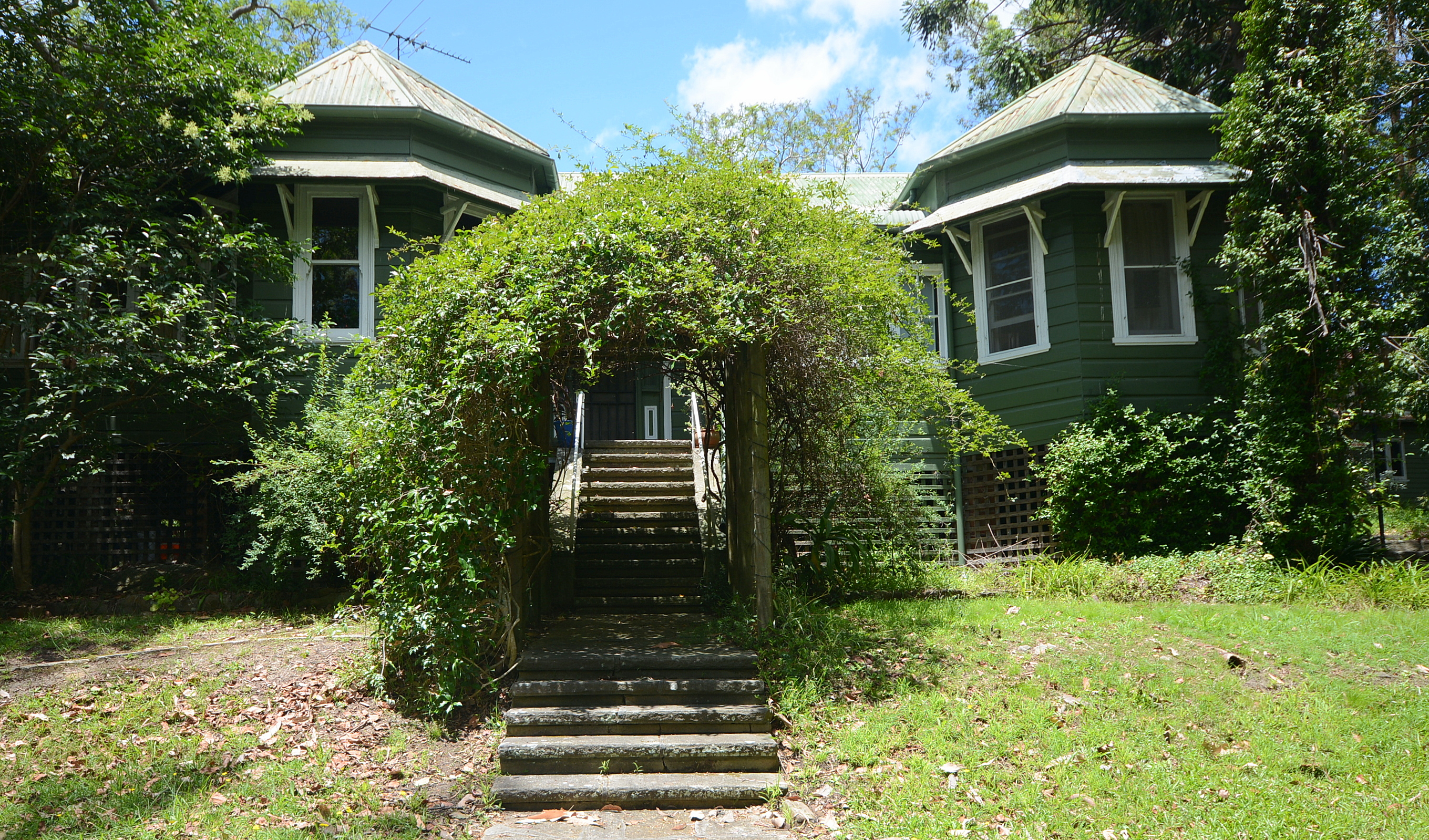
Coringah, former home of Edgeworth David

- Bill Alley, cricketer
- Ted Ball, professional golfer
- Jimmy Bancks, creator of Ginger Meggs
- Liz Burch, actress
- George Collingridge, Australian writer and artist; a small reserve in Hornsby is named after him, former home is currently the chapel of Hornsby Hospital
- William Henry "Billy" Cook, jockey
- Edgeworth David, Welsh-Australian geologist, namesake of Edgeworth David Community Garden
- John Davies, archivist, writer
- Jordan De Goey, Australian rules footballer
- Peter Fowler, golfer
- Rachael Gunn, Olympic break-dancer
- Scott Gourley, rugby league player
- Ian Keith Harris, composer
- J J Hilder, watercolorist
- Ashton Irwin, drummer in pop-rock band 5 Seconds of Summer
- Jim Lees, former NSW police commissioner
- Robert Madgwick, Australian educationist
- Bede Morris (1927–1988), immunologist
- Marc Newson, dersigner
- Julian O'Neill, former rugby league fullback
- Dan Parks, rugby union player
- Patrick Power, former senior counsel in New South Wales, Australia
- Tim Slade, professional racing driver
- Fred Stolle, tennis player
- Rich Thompson, professional American baseball pitcher for the Los Angeles Angels
- Nathan Tutt, rugby league player
- Ted White, cricketer
- Simon Whitlock, professional darts player competing on the PDC circuit
- Danny Williams, rugby league player
- Travis Bazzana, Major League Baseball player, born 2002
