= Baby Bunting =

Australian children's products retailers

Baby Bunting Group Limited
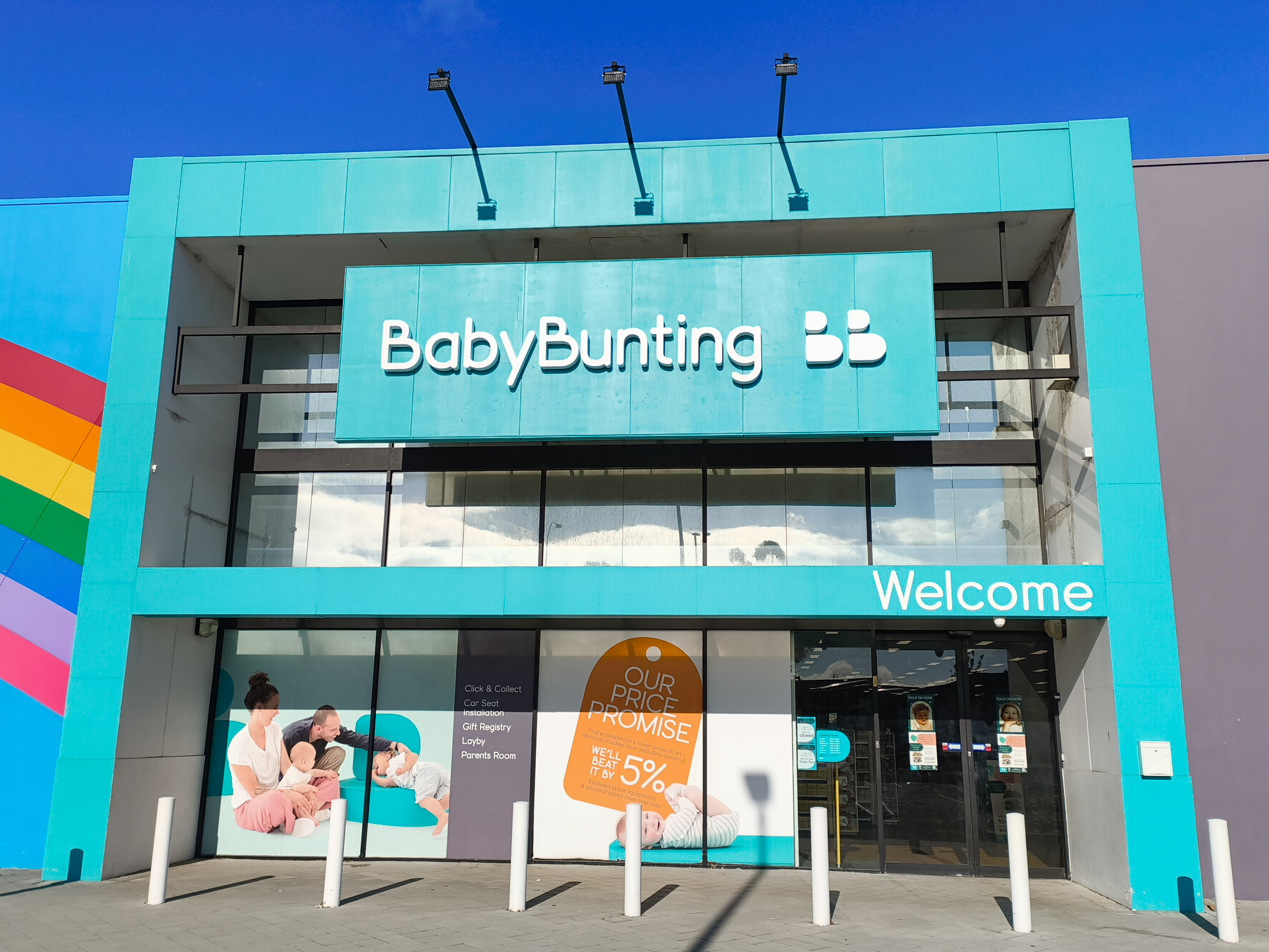
- Baby Bunting store in Cannington, Western Australia
- Type: Public
- Traded as: ASX: BBN
- Industry: Retail
- Founded: 1979
- Number of locations: 74 stores (2024)
- Area served: Australia; New Zealand
- Products: Baby and children's products
- Website: babybunting.com.au; babybunting.co.nz

Baby Bunting Group Limited is an Australian baby products retail chain. Its stores, located across Australia (plus four in New Zealand) but with a focus on Australia's eastern coast, sell baby and children's clothing and items.

== History ==
Baby Bunting was founded in Melbourne in 1979, and the company became one of Australia's largest infant items retailers. In August 2022, it announced its sales exceeded $500 million for the first time, and in addition to its 65 Australian stores, announced it would be opening its first store in New Zealand. However, the company was also experiencing a squeeze on profit margins.

=== 2023 crisis ===
In early 2023, rising Australian living costs were pressing parents to concentrate on shopping for necessary items such as car seats and other practical items, cutting discretionary expenditure on toys and non-essential items. The company, then led by CEO Matt Spencer, reported a 67% drop in profits due to the inflationary pressures, and reported that Spencer would be stepping down as CEO. On 23 May 2023, it was announced that Mark Teperson, former CEO of Afterpay, was replacing Spencer as CEO. Following profit warnings, the company's share price dropped further in June 2023 after it revealed ‘unprecedentedly low’ sales during a key promotional period.

In August 2023, Baby Bunting opened an online marketplace in an effort to provide more baby products on a single site.
