= Prince of Denmark's March =

Trumpet voluntary by Jeremiah Clarke, c. 1700

Prince of Denmark's March
Arrangement for organ

Trumpet Voluntary
Arrangement for trumpet, string orchestra and organ by Henry Wood

The Prince of Denmark's March (Danish: Prins Jørgens March), commonly called the Trumpet Voluntary, was written around 1700 by the English composer Jeremiah Clarke, the first organist of the then newly-rebuilt St Paul's Cathedral.

== Composition ==
For many years the piece was attributed incorrectly to Clarke's elder and more widely known contemporary Henry Purcell. The misattribution emanated from an arrangement for organ published in the 1870s by William Spark, the town organist of Leeds, England. It was later arranged for several different ensembles by Sir Henry Wood.

The oldest source is A Choice Collection of Ayres, a collection of keyboard pieces published in 1700. A contemporary version for wind instruments also survives. According to some sources, the march was written in honour of Prince George of Denmark, husband of Queen Anne of Great Britain.

Clarke also composed "King William's March" in honour of Prince George's brother-in-law William III.

== Usage ==
=== Historical ===
Popular as wedding music, the march was played during the wedding of Lady Diana Spencer and Prince Charles at St Paul's Cathedral in 1981 and during the wedding of Prince Joachim of Denmark and Alexandra Manley in 1995.

The march was broadcast often by BBC Radio during World War II, especially when programming was directed to occupied Denmark, since the march symbolised a connection between those two countries. The broadcasts were introduced by the first bars of the tune voiced over by the words "Her er London. BBC sender til Danmark." ("This is London. BBC is broadcasting to Denmark.") In Denmark the march thus became strongly associated with the opposition to Nazi occupation and propaganda. It is still performed during the annual celebrations of the liberation. For many years, the Trumpet Voluntary remained the European Service signature tune of the BBC World Service.

It is the corps march, both slow and quick, of the British Army's Royal Army Chaplains' Department.

A variant of the tune is used in the final chorus of John Gay's ballad opera Polly, which premiered in 1777 as The Temple.

=== In popular culture ===
- Peter Sellers parodied the tune in his satire on the use of "classics" by pop musicians, titled "Trumpet Volunteer" from his album The Best of Sellers.
- The piece was used on The Colbert Report as the theme for the recurring segments Colbert Platinum (on trumpet) and Colbert Aluminum (on kazoo).
- The march is used as the background music during the hourly performance of the Royal Clock in the Queen Victoria Building, Sydney, Australia.
- The tune was sampled for the Greatest Thing Ever segment from the Cartoon Network show Mad.
- The soundtrack by Vladimir Dashkevich to The Adventures of Sherlock Holmes and Dr. Watson, a series of Soviet television films produced between 1979 and 1986, was inspired by this composition. The arrangement by Henry Wood for trumpet, string orchestra and organ was known to the Soviet public as the signature tune of the shortwave BBC Russian Service, and an orchestral piece in a similar style was created which could be identified with the spirit of the British Empire.
- It was used as Lord Steven Regal's entrance music in World Championship Wrestling while competing as a heel/villain.
- A brief portion of the tune can be heard at the end of the 1997 song "Tubthumping" by British anarcho-punk band Chumbawamba and in the coda of The Beatles' 1969 song "It's All Too Much".
- It was one of the seventeen classical pieces used in creating the lead track of the 1981 Hooked on Classics project.
- It was used as the melodic counterpoint to the intro and verses of Sting's hit "All This Time".
- It was used in the final wedding scene of the film Foolin' Around.
