= Royal Clock =

Clock in Sydney, Australia

Coordinates: 33.872041°S 151.206713°E

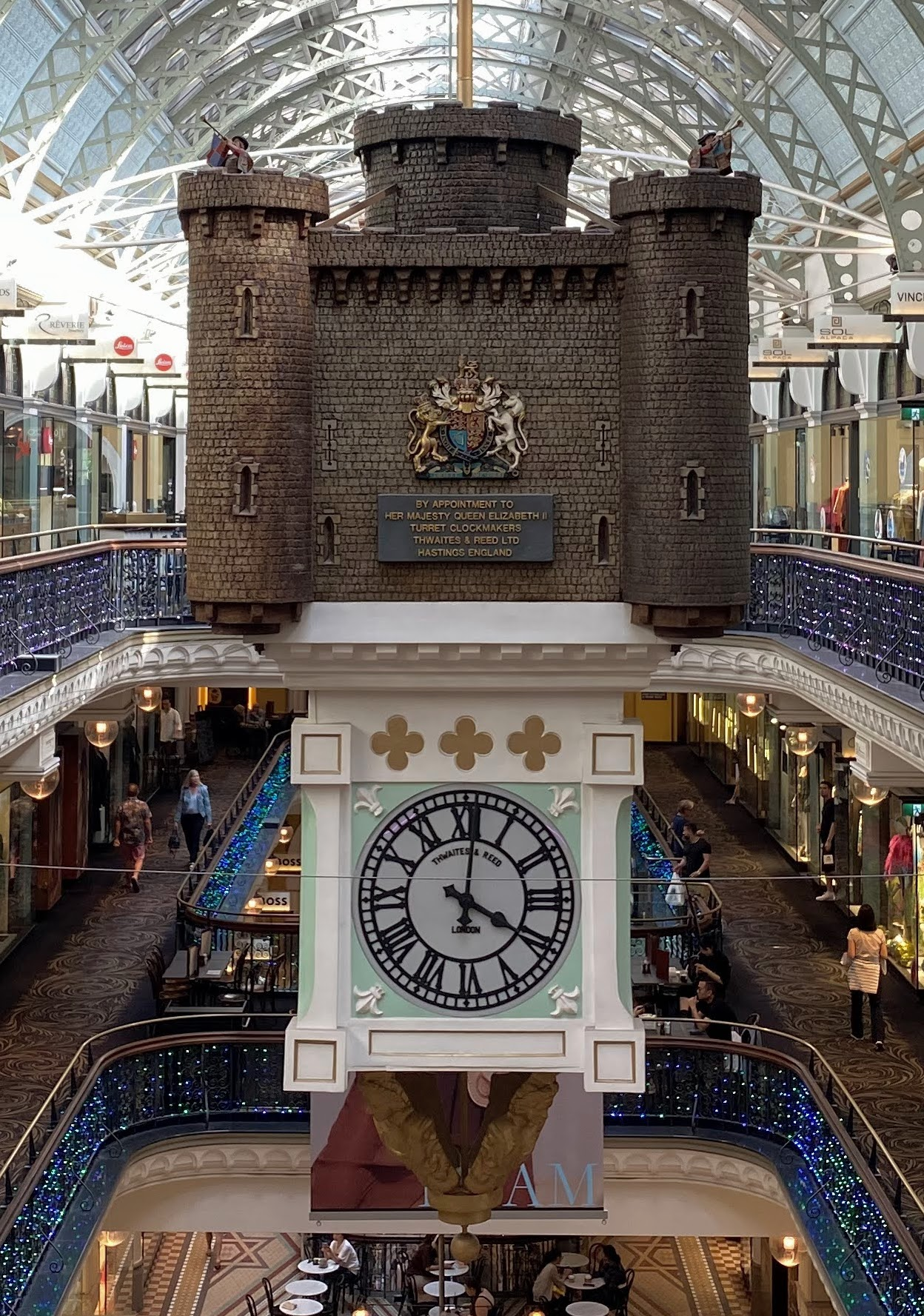
The Royal Clock in the Queen Victoria Building, Sydney, Australia.

The Royal Clock is located on the upper level of the southern half of the Queen Victoria Building in Sydney, New South Wales, Australia. It was designed by Neil Glasser and made by Thwaites & Reed of Hastings in England, and when activated, displays scenes of English royalty. The plaque on the side of the clock reads "By appointment to Her Majesty Queen Elizabeth II. Turret Clockmakers Thwaites & Reed Ltd Hastings England".

== Performance ==
The clock activates on the hour from 9 am until 9 pm. Each performance begins with the music of the trumpet voluntary as miniature trumpeters emerge from the tops of each of the clock's four outer turrets. The trumpeters withdraw at the end of the voluntary. The six scenes are viewed (one at a time) through windows on both sides of the clock that face the railed walkways. Each scene briefly illuminates to display a diorama of English royal history, before dimming and rotating to the left in preparation for the next scene. Most of the scenes include mechanical animation. One of these for example, depicts the execution of King Charles I.

== Music ==
The Royal Clock's performance is accompanied by music written by Jeremiah Clarke called The Prince of Denmark's March (commonly known as the Trumpet Voluntary).

== Scenes ==
The six scenes (in chronological order) depict:

- Cnut the Great commanding the tide to halt.
- King Harold dying on the field at the Battle of Hastings in 1066.
- John, King of England signing Magna Carta in 1215. Also present in the scene is Stephen Cardinal Langton.
- Henry VIII and his six wives.
- Queen Elizabeth I knighting Sir Francis Drake aboard the Golden Hind in 1588 (an apocryphal scene as the ceremony was performed by the ambassador from France—in the Queen's presence).
- The execution of King Charles I in 1649.
- Atop the clock there are Four Heralds who appear to announce the start of the performance
- Each of the mechanised 3D scenes in the clock was created Marcus Replicas, Leicestershire, a firm which specialised in making lifelike figures and three dimensional scenes from history. Dennis Morton (co-owner of and chief designer for the firm) created the design for each scene, after which both he and Elizabeth Sharp (an artist and sculptor who specialised in equestrian subjects), spent over three years creating the figures which would bring them to life. Each figure was sculpted in clay, before being cast in resin and then hand painted in acrylics and metallic paints by Marcus Replicas' own team of painters. Once complete, the figures were assembled into their respective historical tableaux and Elizabeth painted a background scene for each one, intended to evoke a sense of the relevant period. Each completed scene was then sent to Thwaites and Reed to be mechanised and assembled into the clock itself.

== See also ==
- Hornsby Water Clock
- Nylex Clock
