= Hornsby Water Clock =

Kinetic sculpture in Hornsby, Sydney, Australia

Coordinates: 33°42′14.4″S 151°6′2.1″E

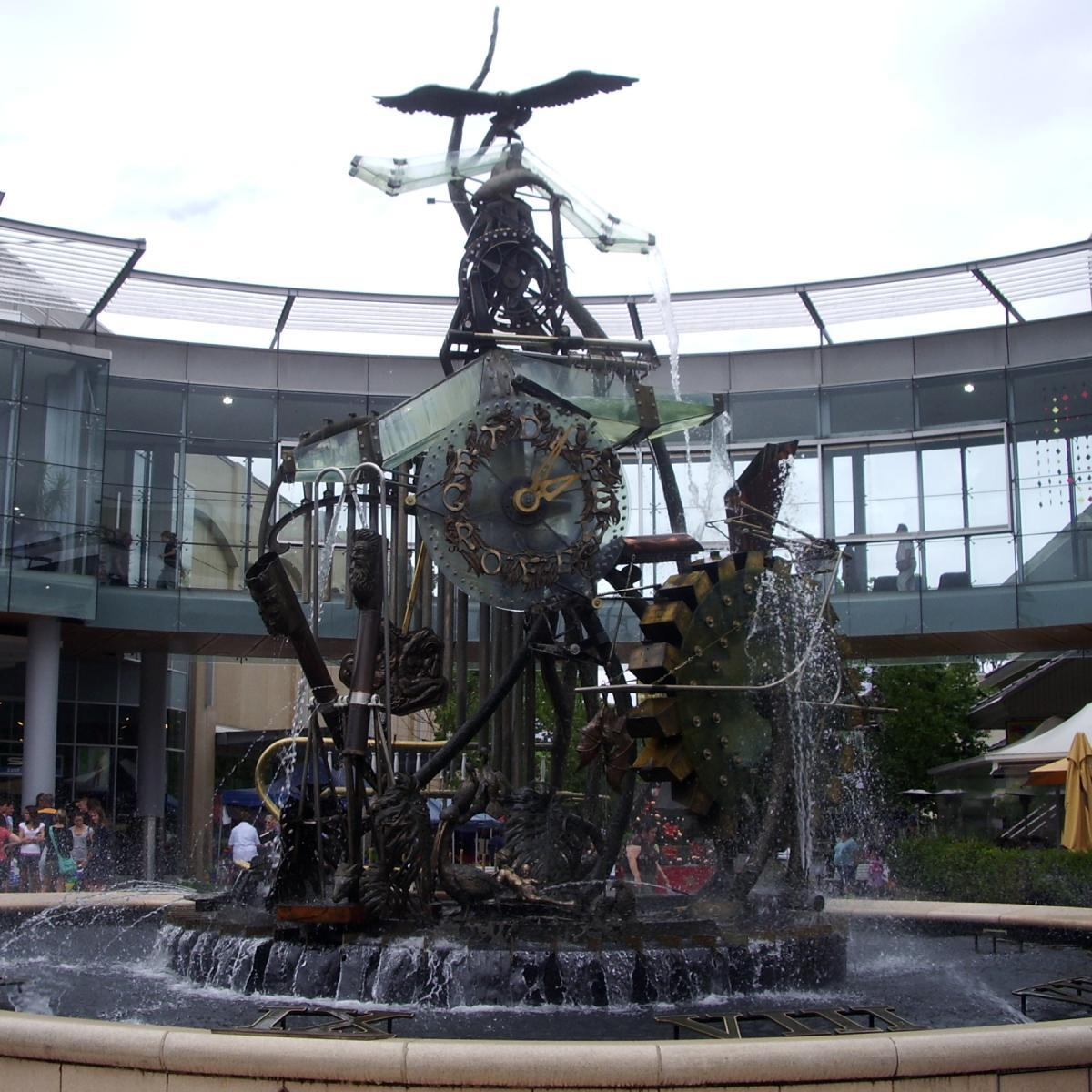
Man, Time and the Environment by Victor Cusack

The Hornsby Water Clock, titled Man, Time and the Environment, is a piece of kinetic sculpture, a decorative fountain and an occasionally functional clock in the Florence Street pedestrian mall in Hornsby, New South Wales, Australia. Unveiled in 1993, the sculpture was designed and engineered by Victor Cusack and constructed of bronze, stainless steel and glass by Victor and his foundry floor manager Rex Feakes. Construction, including alterations to the mall, cost over A$1 million and took two and half years; thereafter, chicken bones and other carelessly discarded items caused many breakdowns before the water filtration system was upgraded. As of 2026, many of the moving parts have been fixed still, and it no longer tells time.

== Overview ==
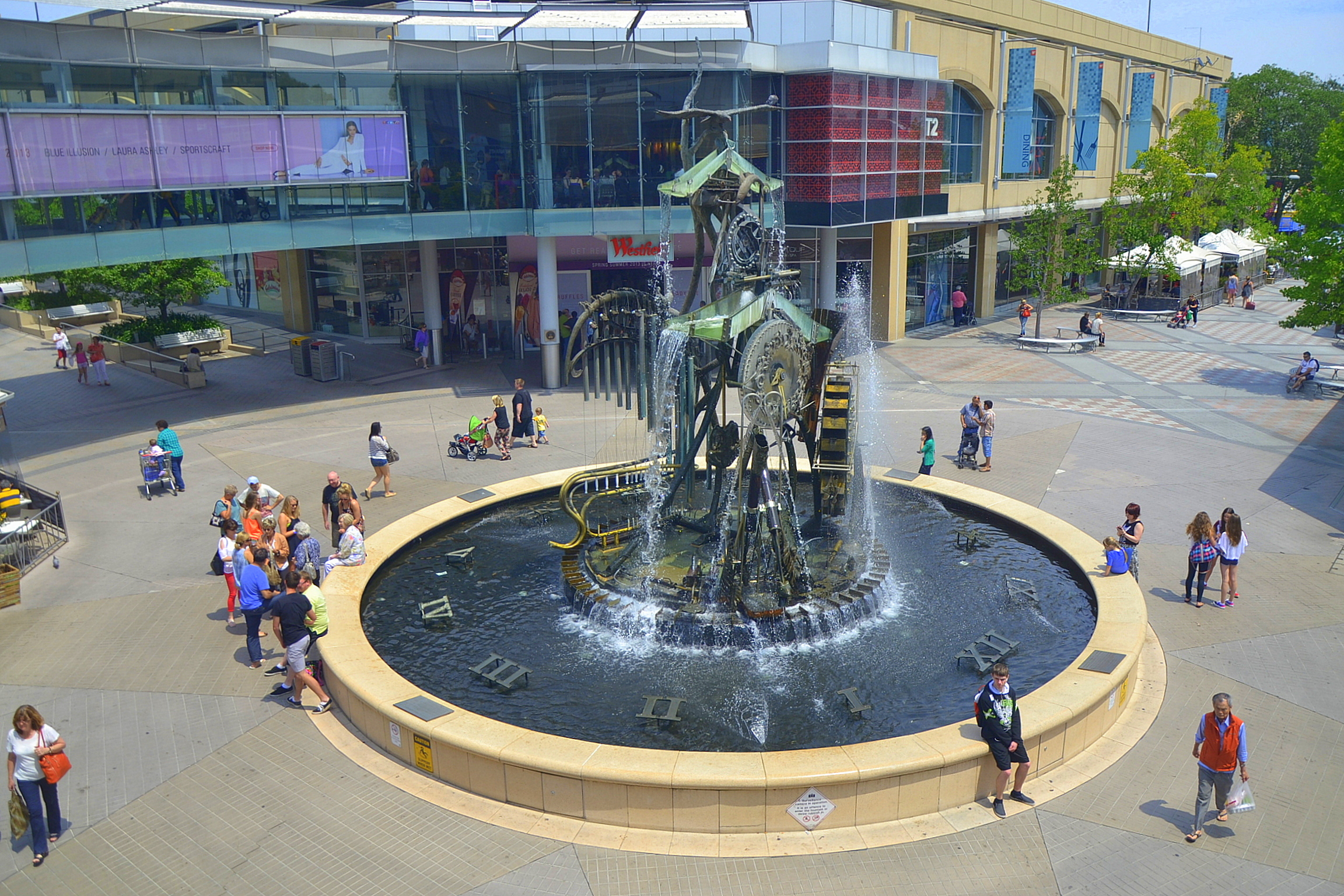
The water clock with Florence Street mall behind

The sculpture is a combination of three water-powered clocks – a 4th-century BC Greek clepsydra, an 11th-century Chinese water wheel clock and a 17th-century Swiss pendulum clock – plus a 17-note bronze carillon to ring the hour based on a 250-year-old design found in an old English church. The whole assembly is mounted on a floating pontoon that rotates every 12 hours giving a fourth time indicator as a pointer sweeps past Roman numerals placed in the water around the fountain's perimeter.

The sculpture is approximately 8 metres (26 ft) tall and weighs 20 tonnes (22 short tons).

== Philosophy ==
The clock is adorned with four plaques, three of which explain the operation of the three individual clocks in the overall structure, and one explaining the clock's purpose overall.

This first plaque says, "This mobile water sculpture is a unique environmental statement, particular relevant to Hornsby, an area retaining extensive unspoilt natural areas with abundant land and marine based flora and fauna. Its symbolism is contrasting man's historically joyful creativity with his rapidly increasing inability to co-exist with virtually all forms of life on earth."

It goes on to suggest there is a "polarity" between the "joyful complexity of creation" shown in the mechanisms mankind has invented such as those on display and the destruction we are causing by the rapidly rising global population. It pays "tribute" to the beauty of the environment in the area and our need to be responsible to our "fellow animals (human and otherwise)".

Animals represented in the sculpture are the:

- Tawny frogmouth
- Rainbow lorikeet
- Pied cormorant
- Little penguin
- Australian pelican
- Australian water dragon
- Blue-tongued lizard
- Goanna
- Grey-headed flying fox
- Brushtail possum
- Sea eagle
- Human

== Individual clocks ==
=== Greek clepsydra clock ===
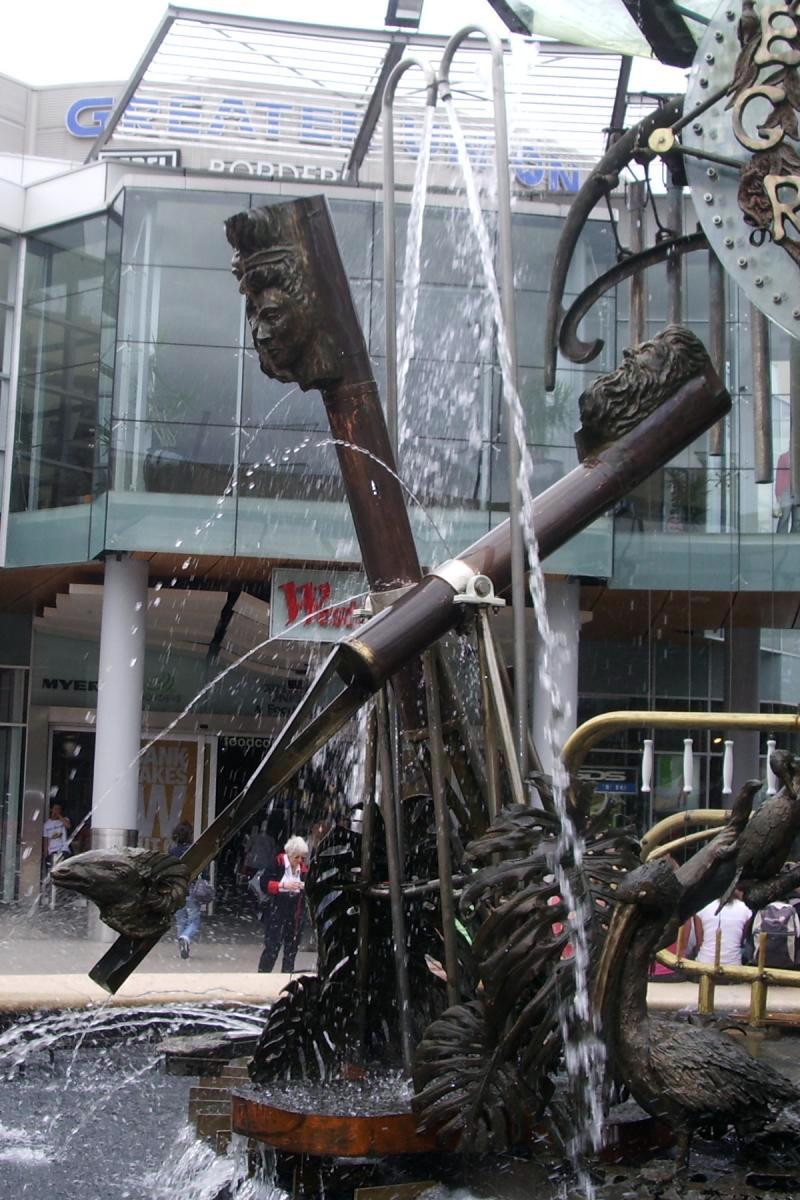
Greek clepsydra section of the fountain

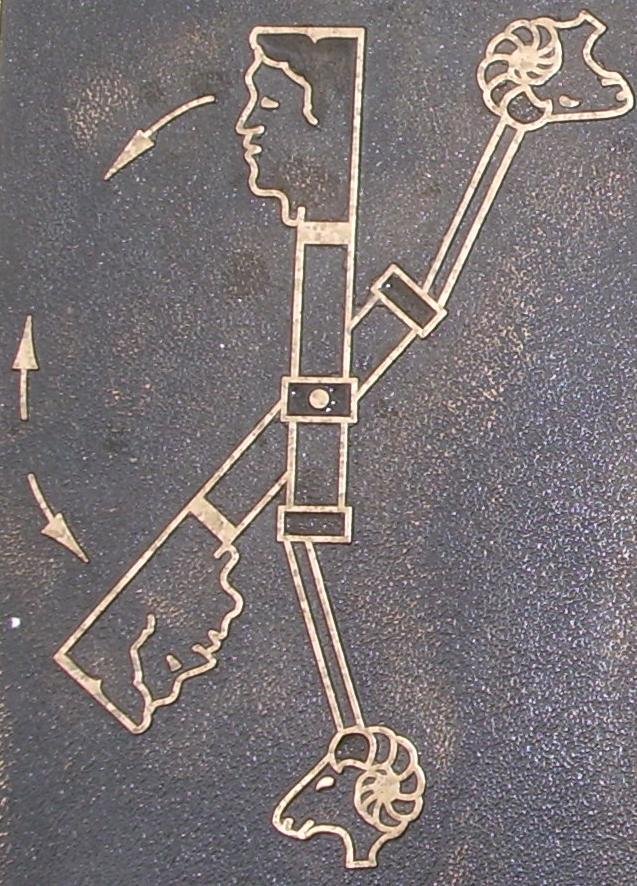
Diagram showing general arrangement of the Greek clepsydra

In this type of clock, water is run into a stationary vessel from a tank which is kept meniscus-full meaning that water rises over the top edge of the tank forming a convex meniscus and excess water is drained away. Since the depth of the water in the supply tank is constant, water is released at a constant rate; the depth of water in the receiving vessel is a measure of time.

In this example, two tubes on bearings are arranged so that they overbalance when full, thereby dumping their contents into the pond and returning to vertical under the influence of a counterweight at which point the cycle starts over. The counterweight is in the shape of a ram's head, while the top of each tube is decorated with the head of a Hermaphrodite.

=== Chinese water wheel clock ===
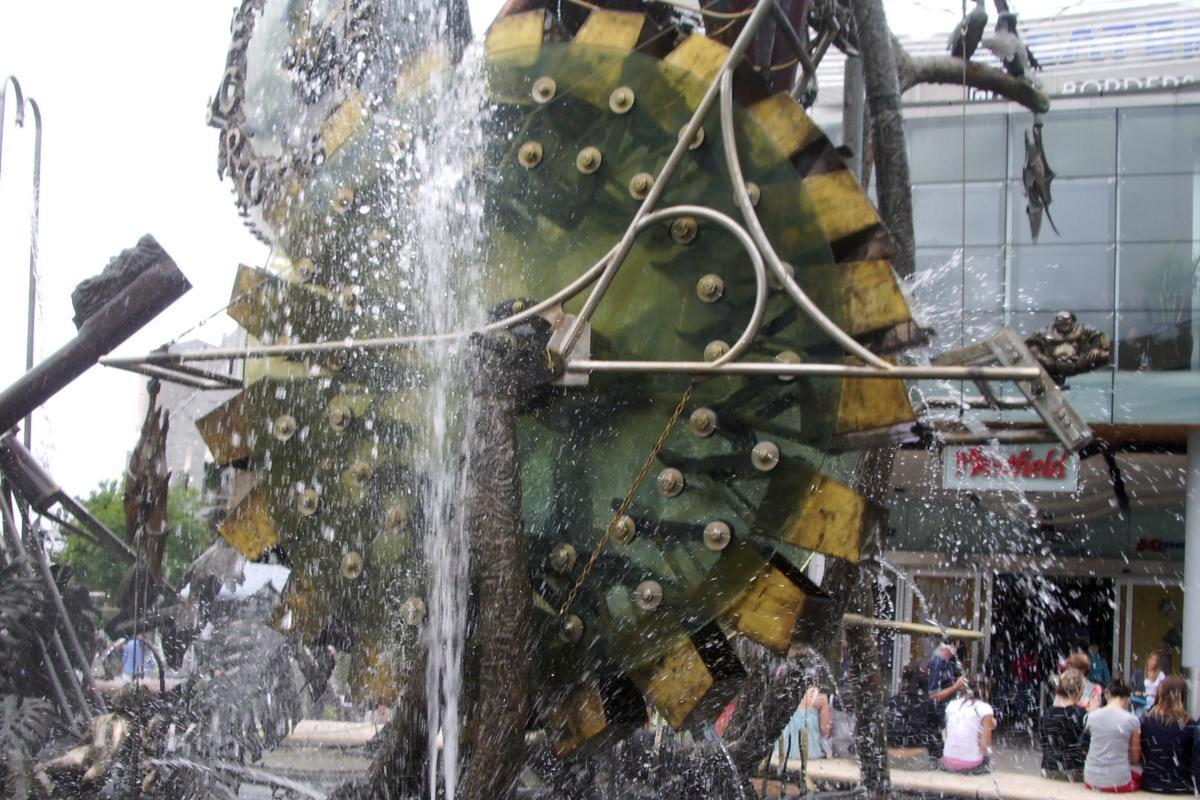
Chinese water wheel clock section of the fountain

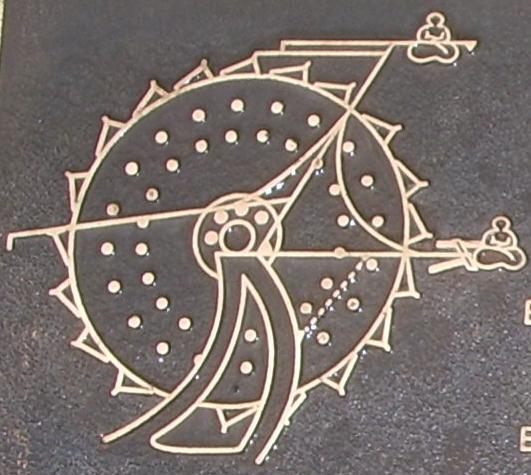
Diagram showing general arrangement of the Chinese water wheel clock

This clock uses 20 counterweighted buckets that are free to swing and are mounted around the edge of a wheel 2.3 metres (7.5 ft) in diameter. Water supplied from a meniscus-full tank runs into a bucket at a constant rate until the weight of water in the bucket is sufficient to overcome the counterweight (see the Chinese Buddha sculpture) allowing the bucket to tip over spilling its contents. As it falls, it trips a lever connected by a cable to a catch on top of the water wheel which is released to allow the wheel to rotate. However, by the time it has moved on, the catch has returned to its position locking the wheel in place so that the next empty bucket is now under the water flow to repeat the cycle.

The design is based on one by Su Song who built a clock as part of an observatory tower in the period 1088-1092.

=== Swiss pendulum clock ===
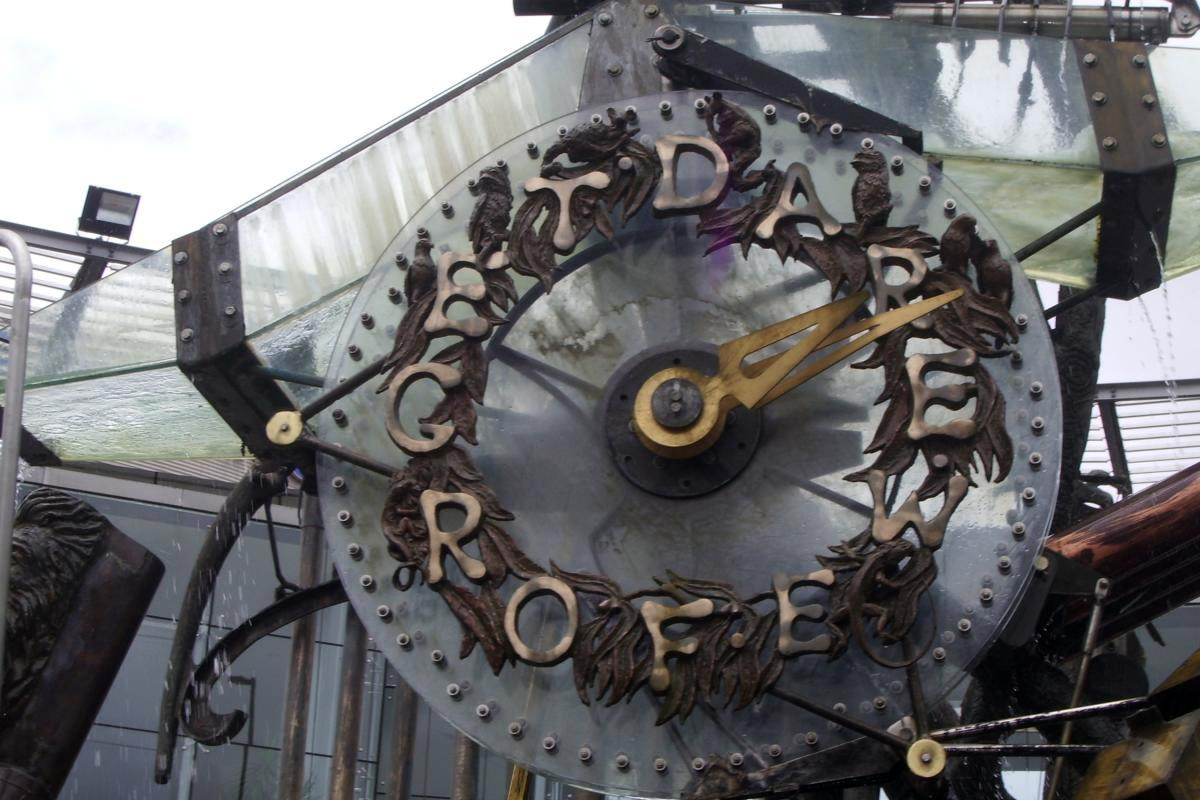
Swiss pendulum clock section of the fountain

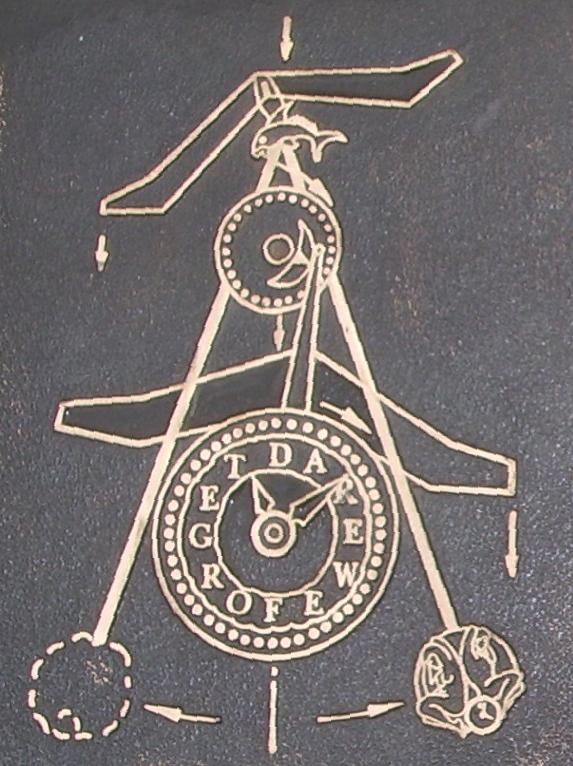
Diagram showing general arrangement of the Swiss pendulum clock

It is claimed that this is "undoubtedly the largest water-driven pendulum clock ever built" and has the same 4 second pendulum cycle time as the Great Clock of Westminster (also commonly known as "Big Ben"), though the pendulum weight is heavier at 350 kg (770 lb). The design is based on one drawn up by Claude Perrault in 1669 but never built.

The 5 m (16 ft) pendulum mounted on a knife-edge to minimize friction and is kept moving by the "top drive" (the top moving glass chutes); as one side becomes full, it tilts the mechanism over to its side so that the water is discharged and the other tank receives the water supply underneath the sea eagle sculpture.

Seconds are marked by the rotation of the glass wheel which has 30 pins around the edge. Each half-cycle of the pendulum (2 seconds) results in the wheel moving to the next pin so it completes a cycle every minute. A cam on the "second wheel" releases the holdback arm on the lower drive every 30 seconds, discharging 100 litres (26 US gal) of water and moves the minute hand once a minute and the hour hand once every 12 minutes.

Instead of numbers, the hours on the clock face are marked by the letters that make up "Dare we forget". The clock is decorated with various animals to "remind us that we are losing species on our earth due to our sometimes insensitive land use" and aboriginal art forms "as a reminder that Hornsby once maintained a strong tribal population that suffered the same fate as many animals are suffering".

The pendulum clock is used to control the rotation of the pontoon, the chimes and to supply water to the Chinese clock.

=== Pontoon rotation clock ===
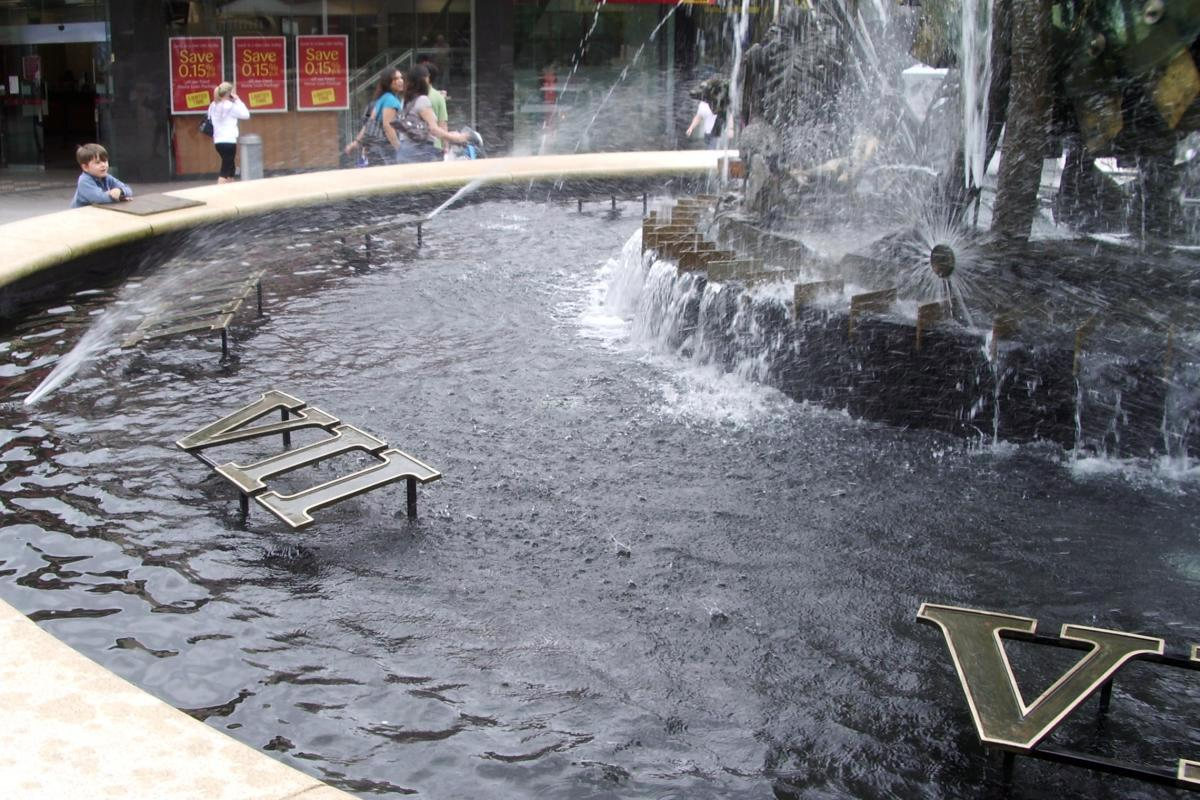
Roman numerals in the pond of the fountain

The complete sculpture is rotated by the water underneath it swirling in a clockwise direction when viewed from above. The rate at which it turns is regulated by a "catch" device on the pontoon edge that locks into one of the 60 stops secured to the wall of the inner pond. Every 12 minutes the catch is released by a mechanism linked the pendulum clock allowing the pontoon to rotate until the next stop is reached.

== Carillon or chime set ==
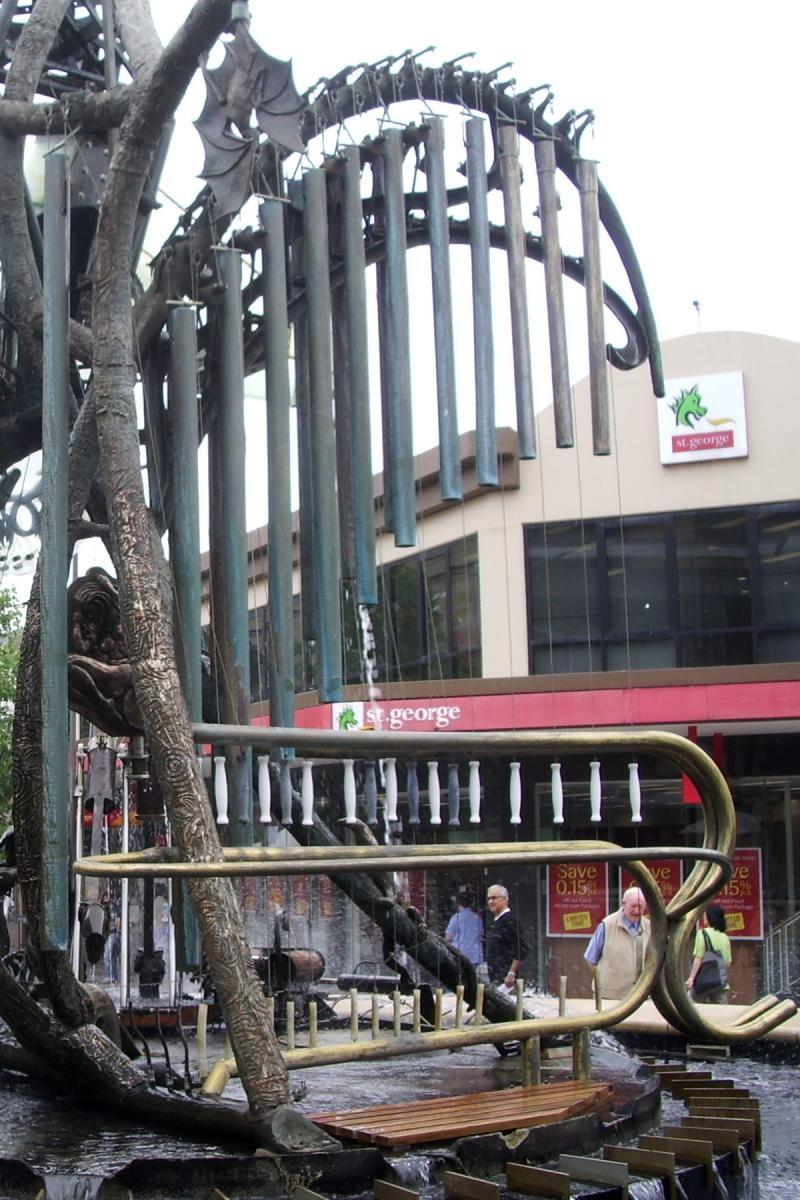
Carillon section of the fountain

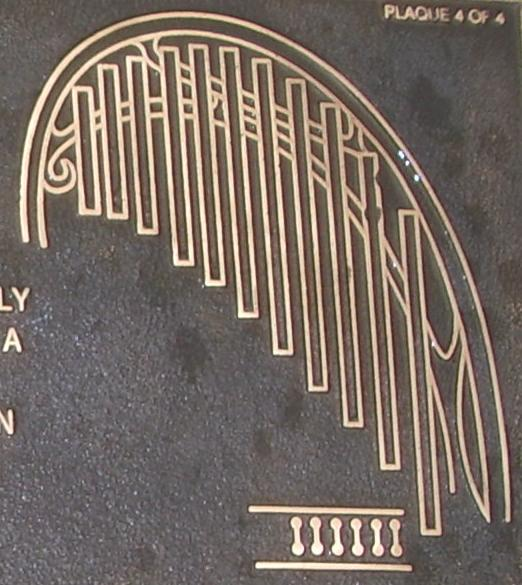
Diagram showing general arrangement of the carillon

The carillon has 17 tubes of cast bell-bronze that chime automatically on the hour, or they can be played manually. The mechanism is of a design invented by "Harringtons of Coventry" and seen by the sculptor at a church in Haywards Heath in Sussex though the frame has been constructed of metal rather than wood and this set has 17 tubes instead of the 6 to 9 seen elsewhere. Together the tubes weigh approximately 1 tonne (1.1 short tons) and span from the octave above Middle C plus 3 notes above and the G note below.

During the 30th Anniversary Celebration, on 24 November 2023, Carillonist Isaac Wong played the carillon.

== Plaques ==
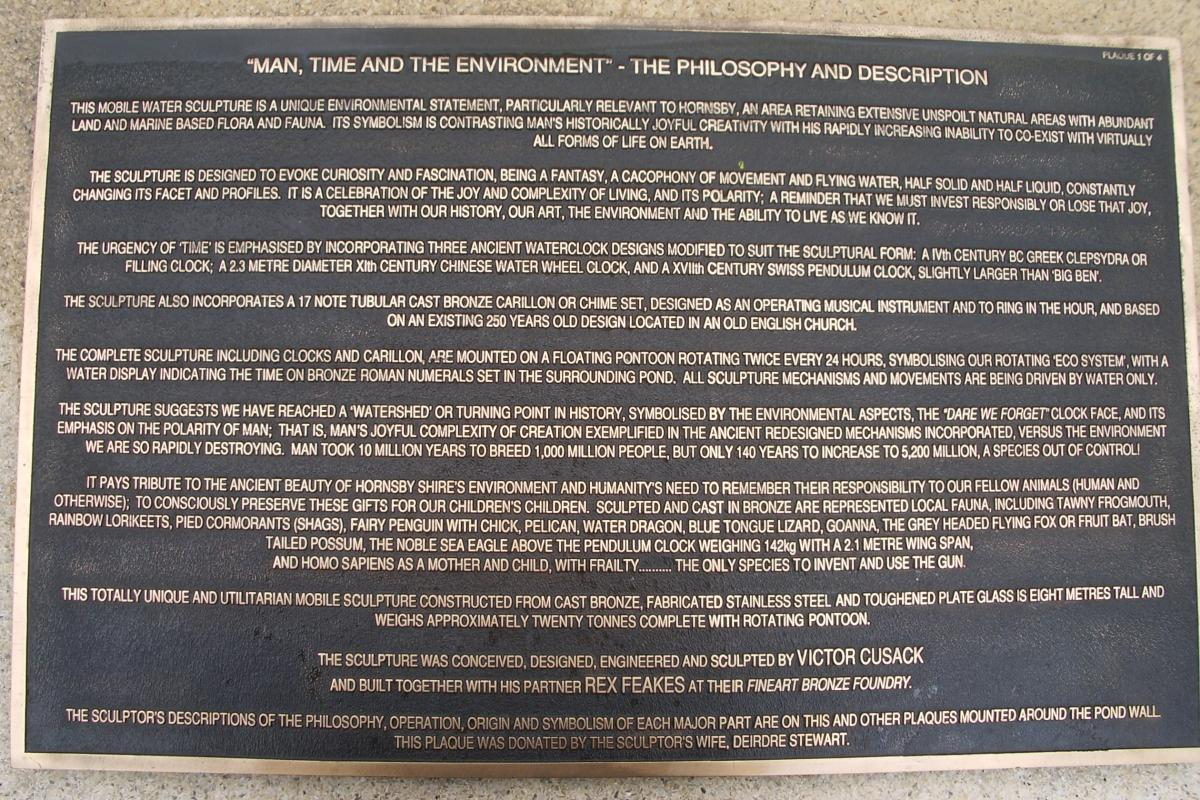
Plaque 1 of 4, giving overview of the fountain/clock

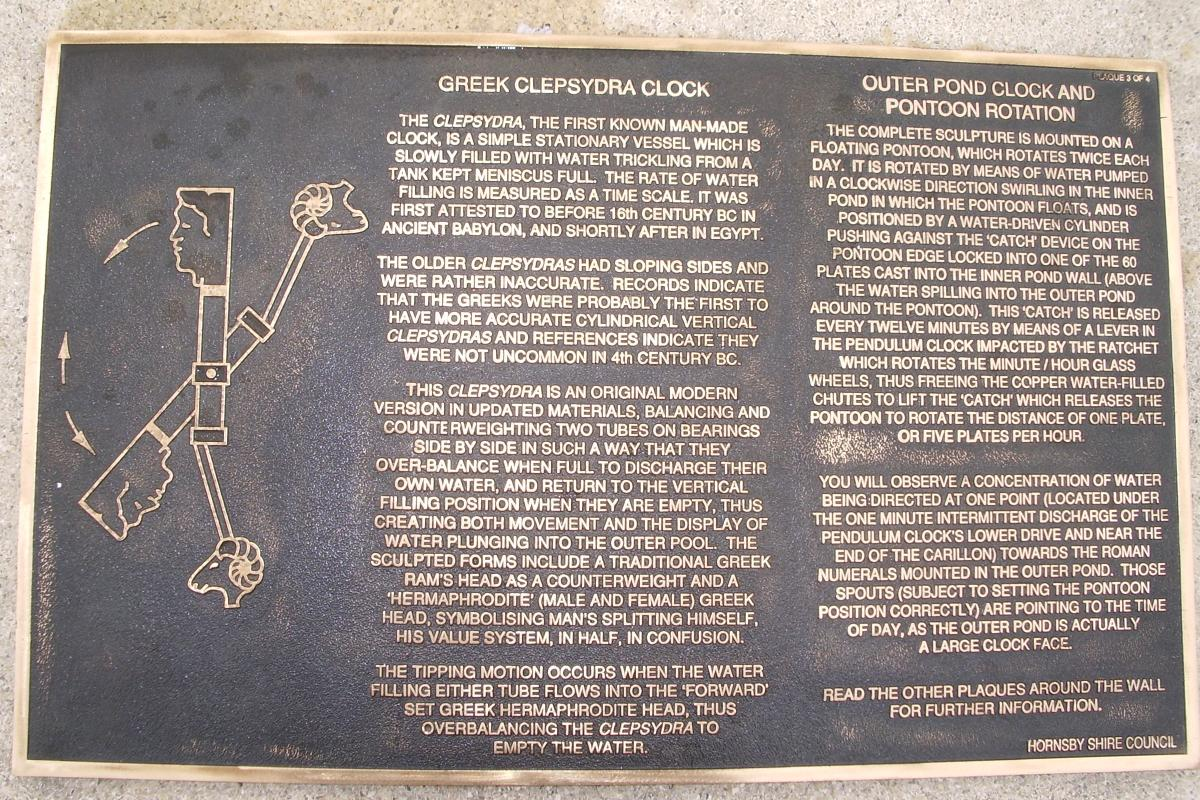
Plaque 2 of 4, giving details of the Greek clepsydra and the clock formed by the whole assembly rotating in the pond

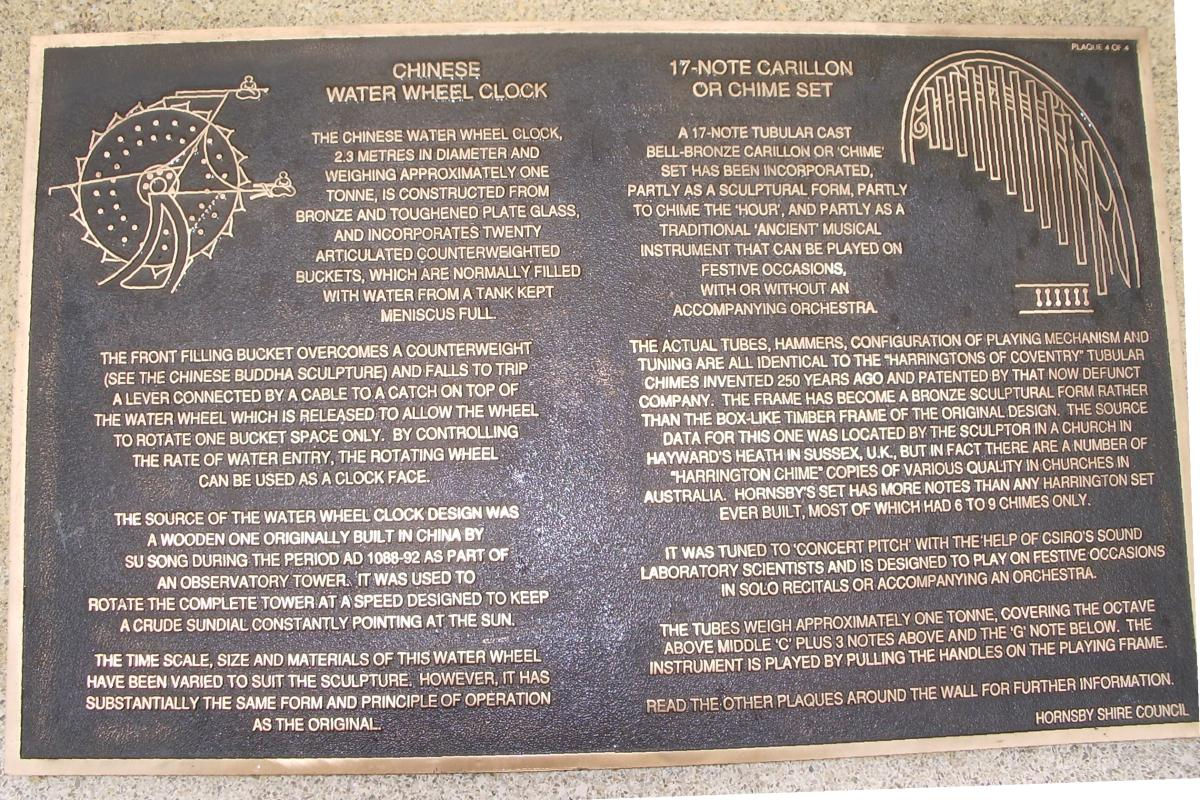
Plaque 3 of 4, giving details of the Chinese water wheel clock and the carillon

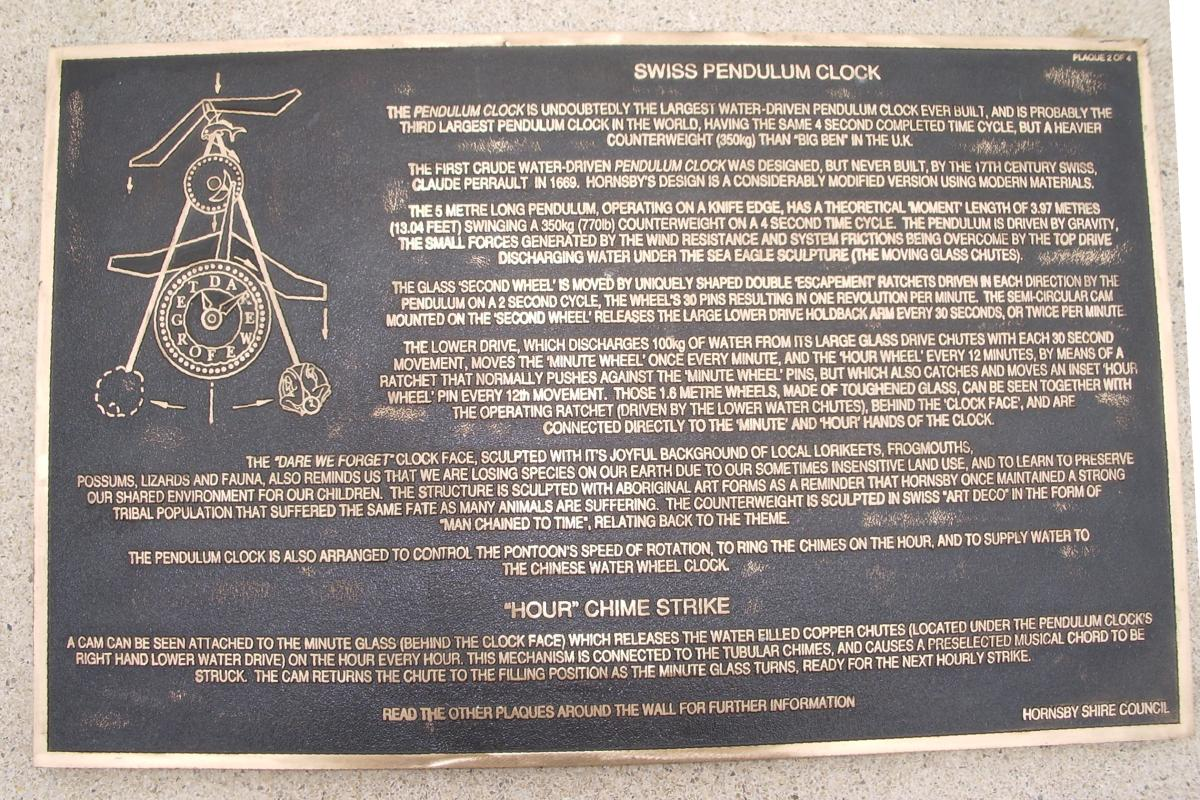
Plaque 4 of 4, giving details of the Swiss pendulum clock and the mechanism that initiates the chimes each hour

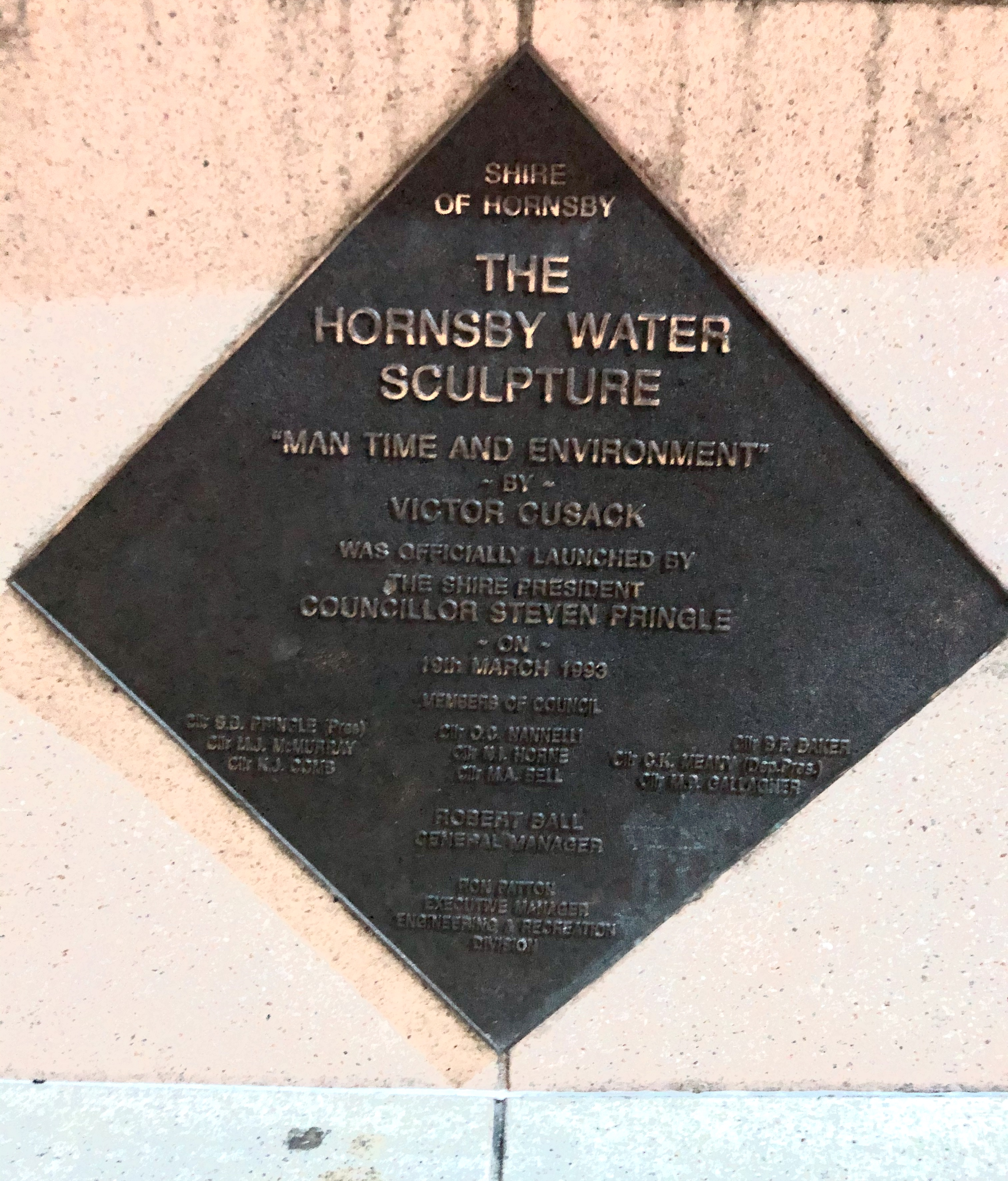
Commemorative plaque for the unveiling of the clock

== Maintenance and condition ==
In the early 2000s the sculpture was removed as part of the renovation of the nearby Westfield shopping centre and damaged which rendered the clock inoperable. In 2005 Cusack, frustrated with its condition and feeling its disrepair affected his artistic reputation, successfully sued the council to maintain it under his moral right as a creator.

By 2015 the sculpture had again fallen into disrepair, with Cusack claiming that the council had neglected basic maintenance, and the council claiming that the repair was not simple.

By 2026 the Hornsby Water Clock was fixed in place so the entire structure no longer rotated on its barge, and the movement of the water wheel was limited. The pendulum was also fixed to reduce wear and tear.

== See also ==
- Nylex Clock
- Royal Clock
