= King William's March =

Work by Jeremiah Clarke

"King William's March" is a work by the English Baroque composer Jeremiah Clarke (1674-1707). 1707)

It was composed in honour of William of Orange who had become King of England following the Glorious Revolution of 1688. Clarke's better known "Prince of Denmark's March" honored William's brother-in-law Prince George of Denmark. The time signature is 4/4 and the music is in the key of D.
