= Edward Purcell =

Edward Purcell may refer to:

- Edward A. Purcell Jr., American historian
- Edward Henry Purcell (died 1765), English organist, printer, and music publisher
- Edward Mills Purcell (1912–1997), American physicist, Nobel Prize winner
- Edward Purcell (musician) (1689–1740), English composer
- Edward Purcell (rugby league) (born 1988), Samoan rugby league international
- Teddy Purcell (Edward Purcell, born 1985), Canadian ice hockey player
