= Orpheus Britannicus =

Collection of songs by Henry Purcell

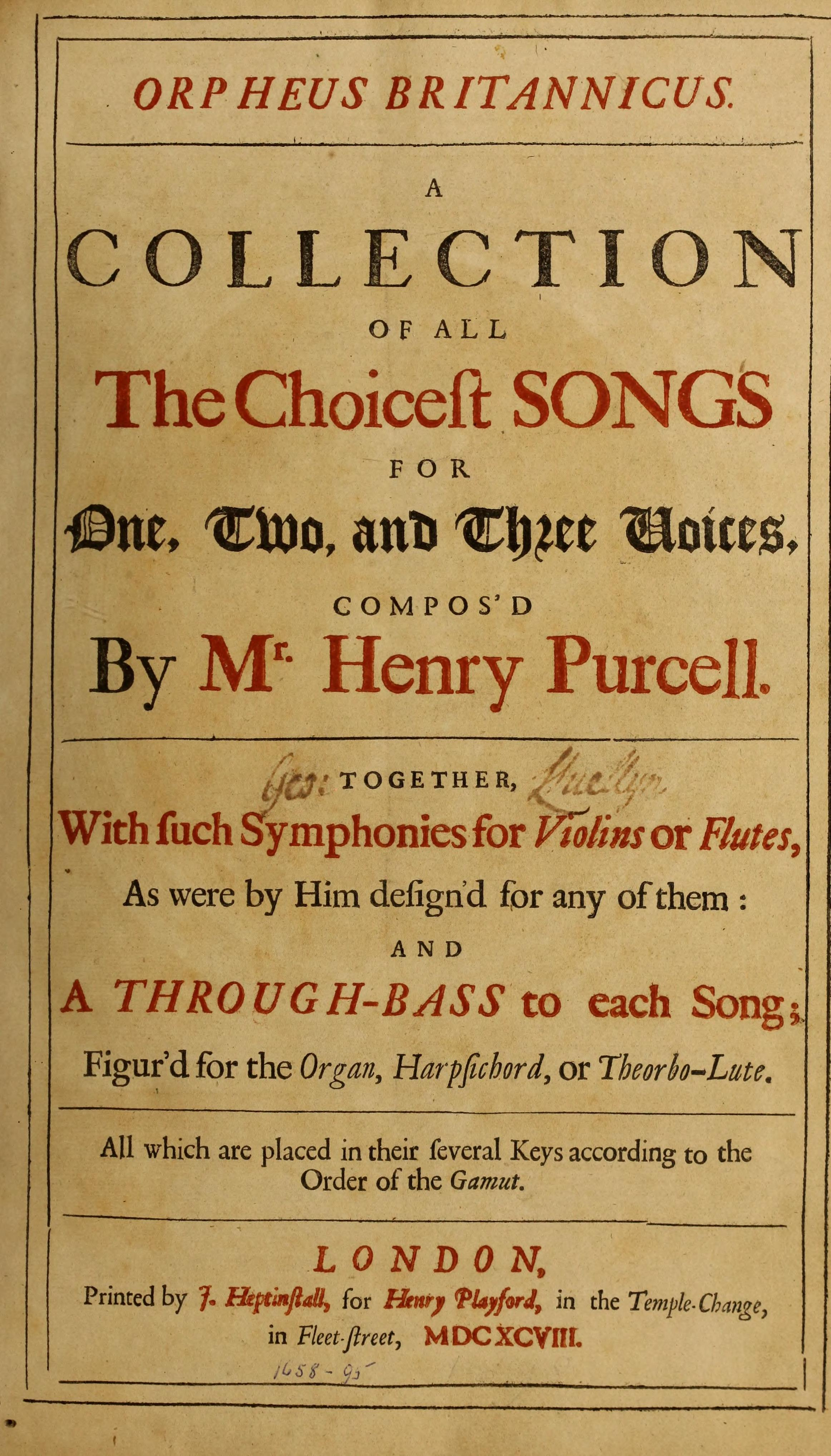
- Title-page of the first edition, London: Henry Playford, 1698
- Author: Henry Purcell
- Language: English
- Genre: domestic vocal music
- Published: Volume I: London, 1698: Henry Playford; printed by John Heptinstall; London, 1706, second edition: John Young; printed by William Pearson; London, 1706, second edition: John Cullen; printed by William Pearson; London, 1721, third edition: S.H., John Young; printed by William Pearson; Volume II: London, 1702: Henry Playford; printed by William Pearson; London, 1711, second edition: S.H., John Young, John Cullen; printed by William Pearson; London, 1712, second edition: S.H., John Young; printed by William Pearson
- Publication place: Kingdom of Great Britain

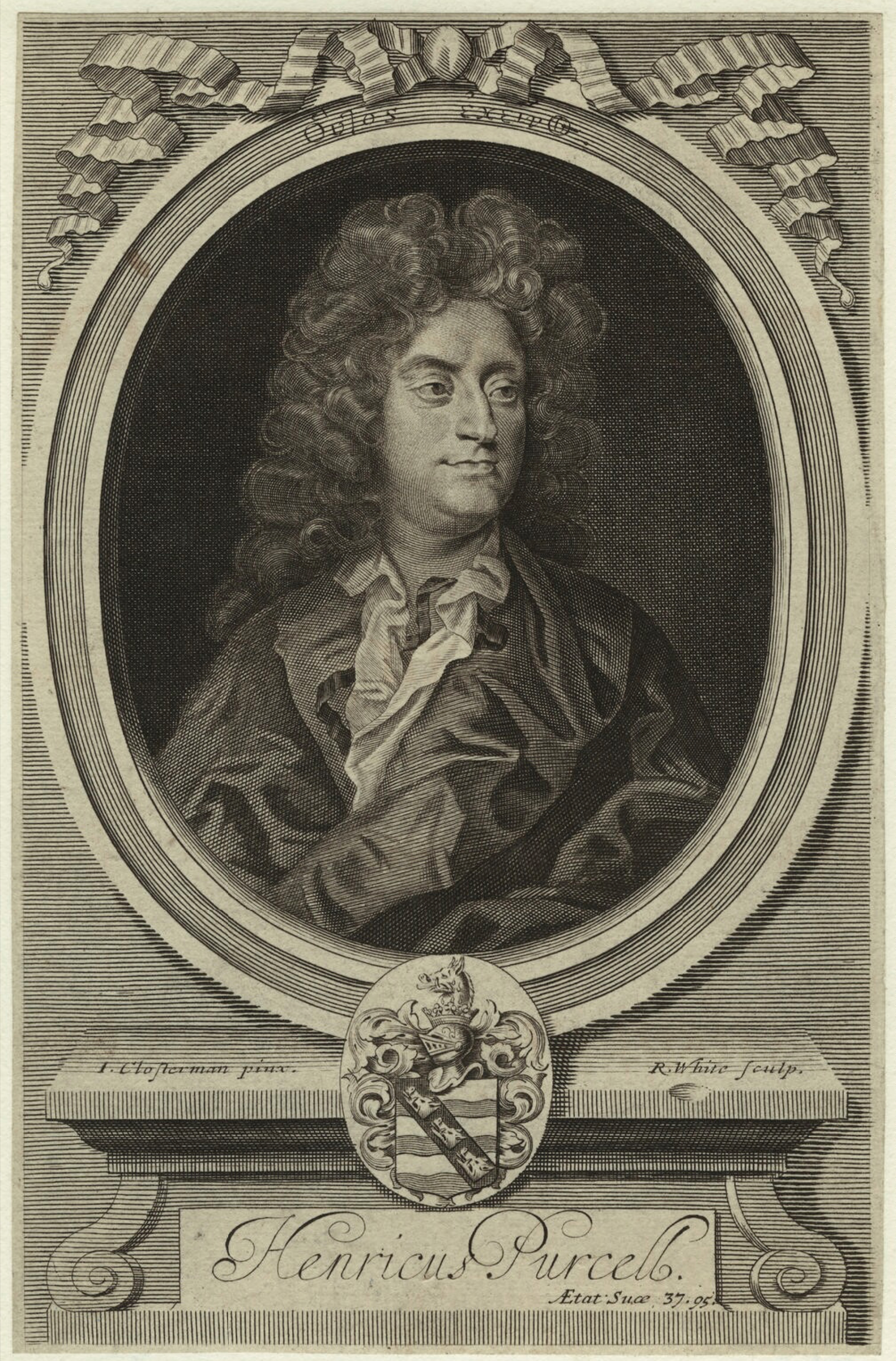
Portrait of Purcell engraved by Robert White after Closterman, as in the first edition of 1698

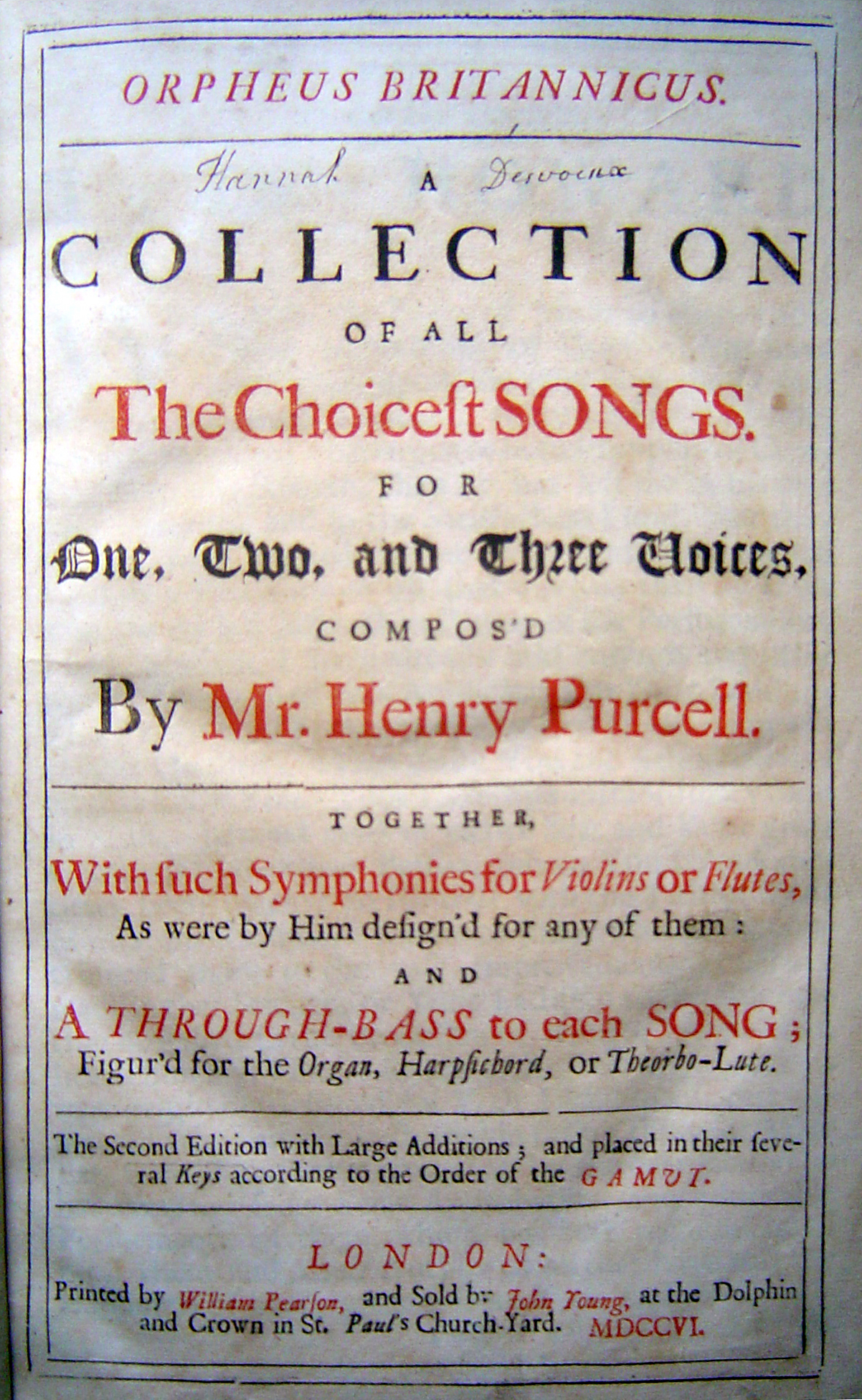
Title-page of the second edition of volume I, London: William Pearson 1706

Orpheus Britannicus is a collection of songs by Henry Purcell, published posthumously in London in two volumes, the first in 1698 and the second in 1702. In the preface to the first volume, Henry Playford – the printer of the volume and the son of the music publisher John Playford – praises Purcell's setting of English texts.

The frontispiece portrait is an engraving by Robert White from a painting by or after the studio of John Closterman, now in the National Portrait Gallery in London.

== History ==
The first volume of Orpheus Britannicus was published in 1698 by Henry Playford; it was printed by John Heptinstall using an improved movable type he had invented, which allowed for beaming of quavers and shorter notes. A second volume, " ... the second book, which renders the first compleat ...", was published by Playford in 1702; it and all subsequent editions were printed by William Pearson using a font similar to Heptinstall's, but smaller and neater.

An expanded second edition of the first volume was published in 1706 in two printings, one by John Young and one by John Cullen; a third edition was published by 'S.H.' and John Young in 1721. A second edition of the second volume was published by 'S.H.', John Young and John Cullen in 1711, and again by 'S.H.' and John Young in 1712. Various volumes were published under this name by John Walsh between about 1730 and 1747; at least one of them was a collection of single-sheet editions of songs from the early years of the eighteenth century.

The first publication of a section of Purcell's opera Dido and Aeneas was the air "Ah! Belinda" in Orpheus Britannicus, transposed up one step, from C to D.

Henry Hall, who had studied composition with Purcell under John Blow, wrote the dedicatory poems at the beginning of each volume, (1698 and 1702) and also wrote one for Blow's Amphion Anglicus.

Amphion Anglicus, a collection of songs, excerpts from odes and chamber music by John Blow, was published in 1700 in emulation of Orpheus Britannicus'.

A later engraver, Benjamin Cole (fl 1740–1760), printed as Orpheus Britannicus a seemingly unrelated set of engravings which he had made originally for The New Universal Magazine (1751–1759).

Benjamin Britten, working with Peter Pears, realised (arranged) and edited a number of songs from Orpheus Britannicus for both solo singer with piano as part of Britten's Purcell Realizations.
