= Cartography of York =

The Cartography of York is the history of surveying and creation of maps of the city of York. The following is a list of historic maps of York:

- c.1610: John Speed's map
- 1624: Samuel Parsons' map of Dringhouses
- c1682: Captain James Archer's Plan of the Greate, Antient & Famous Citty of York
- 1685: Jacob Richards' Survey of the City of York
- 1694: Benedict Horsley's Iconography or Ground Plot of ye City of Yorke
- 1722: John Cossins: A New and Exact Plan of the City of York
- 1748: re-issue of Cossins' New and Exact Plan with five new architectural illustrations across the upper edge of the engraving. These include the new County Hospital and the Assembly Rooms
- 1736: map in Francis Drake's Eboracum
- 1784: William White's plan of York
- various: Tithe maps
- 1822: Alfred Smith's map, published in Edward Baines' History, Directory and Gazetteer of the county of York.
- 1832: map by Robert Cooper
- 1852: York Ordnance Survey
- 1858: Nathaniel Whittock’s Birds Eye View
- 1900: Bacon's map of the environs of York
- 1909: Ordnance Survey map
- 1937: Ordnance Survey map

== Bibliography ==
- Addyman, Peter, ed. (2015). The British Historic Towns Atlas, Volume V, York. Historic Towns Trust. ISBN 978-1-78570-127-6.
- An Inventory of the Historical Monuments in City of York, Volume 2, the Defences. London. 1972 – via British History Online.
- An Inventory of the Historical Monuments in City of York, Volume 3, South west. London. 1972 – via British History Online.
- An Inventory of the Historical Monuments in City of York, Volume 5, Central. London. 1981 – via British History Online.
