= No, Sir, No =

Song

"No, Sir, No" (Roud 146) is an English folk song describing a courtship. It has been collected from traditional singers in England and the USA, and in a bowdlerised version was taught to English schoolchildren in music lessons in the 1950s. Alternative titles include "No, Sir", "No, John, No", "O No John", "Yes Or No", "Cruel Father", "Ripest Apples", "Twenty Eighteen", "The Spanish Merchant's Daughter", "The Spanish Captain", "Spanish Lady", "Yonder Sits a Spanish Lady", "Yonder Sits a Pretty Creature", and "In Yonder Grove".

== Synopsis ==
A young woman (or a Spanish lady) is walking in a garden. A young man tries to court her:

Madam, I am come a'courting,
Hoping your favour I shall gain.
If you'll kindly entertain me,
Perhaps one day I'll call again.

but she always answers "No". She explains that her father (or her husband) has recently gone to sea and before leaving told her always to say "No".:

The young man rephrases his questions, politely in Iowa:

Then while walking in the garden,
Plucking flowers all wet with dew,
Tell me, would you be offended
If I walk and talk with you?

or improperly, in Somerset:

Madam shall I tie your garter
Shall I tie it above your knee?
If I should be little bolder
Would you think it rude of me?

and all ends well, with the couple either in bed, on the way to being married or at least with the young woman offering some encouragement. There is often a chorus, such as

Oh dear oh! No! Sir No!
Still her answer to me was no!

In one English variant the chorus is a counting game:

With me twenty, eighteen, sixteen, fourteen, twelve, ten, eight, six, four, two, none,
Nineteen, seventeen, fifteen, thirteen, 'leven, nine, sev'n, five, three and one.

This variant is sometimes called "Twenty, Eighteen".

The "Twenty, Eighteen" and "Ripest Apples" variants omit the father's command. Joe Jone's version of "The Ripest Apples" is a simple and brief conversation in which he offers her everything and she says:

For it's apples is ripe, but they soon gets rotten.
A young man's love that soon grows cold.
For it's what cares I for the world of pleasure?
But all I wants is an honest young man.

== Early publications ==
A song called "Consent At Last" printed in "Wit and Mirth: Or, Pills to Purge Melancholy" Volume 4, by Henry Playford, published in 1719, has been suggested as a forerunner of "No, Sir, No". It has a chorus which consists mostly of the word "No":

Once more fairest, let me try ye,
Now my wish is fully sped,
If all night, I would lie by ye
Shall I be refused your bed.

O, no, no, no, no, no, O no, no, no, no, no, no, no.

The Roud Folk Song Index lists just two broadside versions, both from the Poet's Box shop in Glasgow.

== Collected versions ==
The Roud Folk Song Index lists 29 versions collected in England, 1 from Scotland 7 from Canada and 36 from the USA.

== Recordings ==
=== Field recordings ===
- There is a version by Sussex singer Emily Sparks, recorded by Desmond Herring in 1958, in the British Library Sound Archive.
- The Norfolk fisherman Sam Larner was recorded singing "No sir, no sir" by Ewan McColl and Peggy Seeger in 1958 or 9. His version is on "Now is the Time for Fishing", Topic TSCD511.
- Sussex singers The Copper Family Bob and Ron Copper sang No, John, No in a recording made by Peter Kennedy. This has been released on "Songs of Courtship" Topic Records 12T157
- Sussex singer George Townshend was recorded singing "Twenty, Eighteen" by Brian Matthews in 1960. His version is on "Come, Hand to Me the Glass" Musical Traditions Records MTCD304/5.
- Kent singer Joe Jones was recorded singing "Ripest Apples" by Mike Yates between 1972-5. This recording has been released on "Here's Luck to a Man - Gypsy Songs and Music from South-East England; Musical Traditions Records MTCD320.

=== Old-time music recordings ===
- A version by the Stoneman Family from Virginia titled "The Spanish Merchant's Daughter", recorded in 1928, was included on Harry Smith's Anthology of American Folk Music in 1952.
- Bradley Kincaid; Mountain Ballads & Oldtime Songs; Bluebonnet BL127; 1963; "No Sir No".
- Jean Ritchie; Precious Memories; Folkways FA 2427; 1962; "No Sir"

=== Recordings by revival singers and groups ===
- Roy Bailey; Roy Bailey; Trailer LER 3021; 1971; "No, Sir, No"
- Jean Redpath; There Were Minstrels; Trailer Records LER 2106; 1976; No Sir
- John Kirkpatrick and Maggie Goodall; The Old Songs; Greenwich Village Records GVR 225; 1984; "No John"
- Crucible; Crux; WildGoose Studios WGS327CD; 2005; "Fair Maid Walking"
- Gavin Davenport with the Albion Band; Fighting Room; 2011, "No Sir No!"
