= Oranges and Lemons =

English folk song

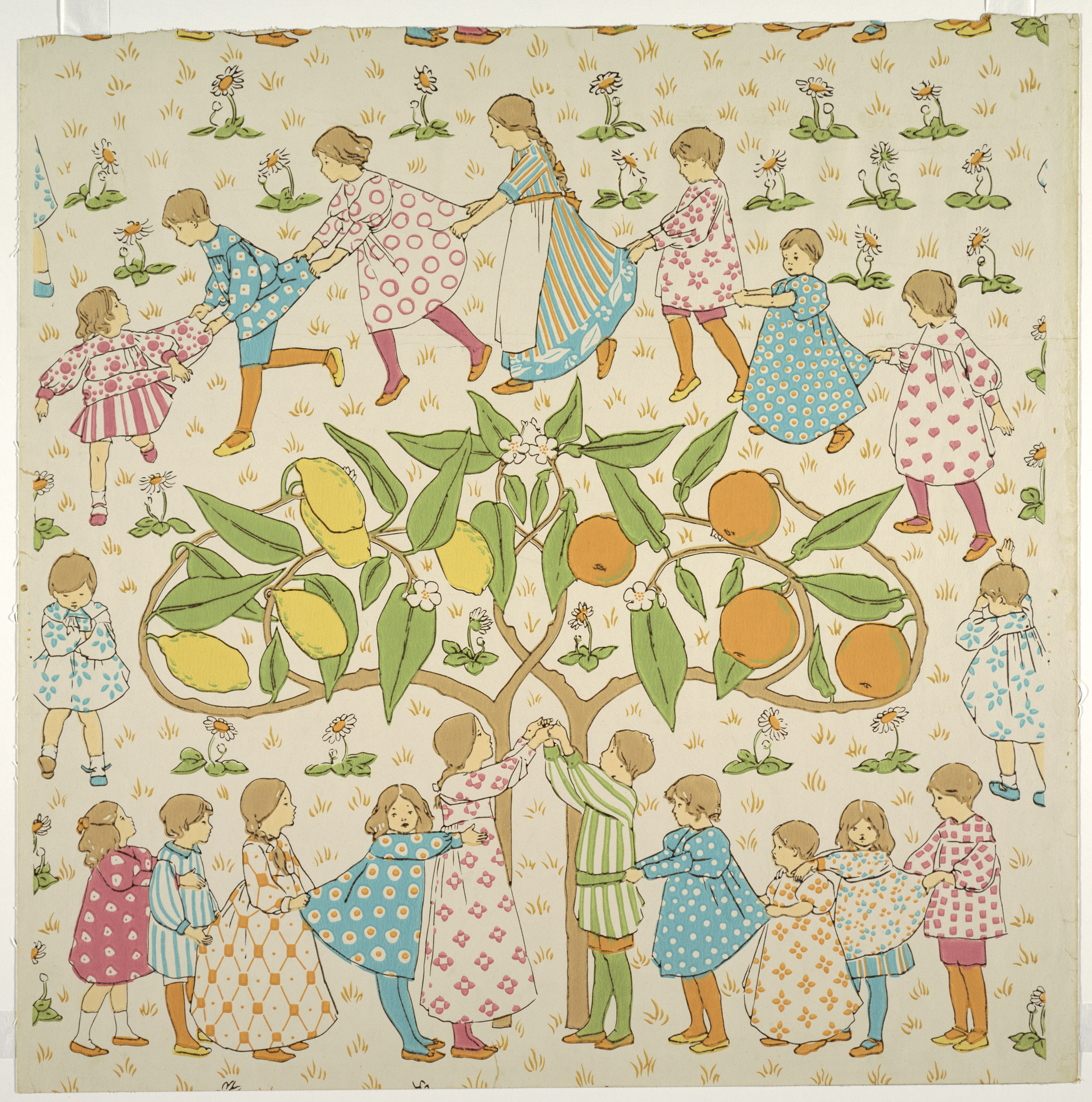
- 1902 machine print

Nursery rhyme
- Published: c. 1744
- Genre: Children's street song
- Songwriter: Traditional

"Oranges and Lemons" is a traditional English nursery rhyme, folksong, and singing game which refers to the bells of several churches, all within or close to the City of London. It is listed in the Roud Folk Song Index as No 13190. The earliest known printed version appeared c. 1744.

The rhyme has been referenced in a variety of works of literature and popular culture. The bells of St Clement Danes (one of many London churches associated with the rhyme) play the tune every day at 9 AM, 12 PM, 3 PM and 6 PM.

== Lyrics ==
Map of the City of London and surrounding area with locations of churches mentioned in the song. (Stepney is just to the east. Click the map to enlarge.) Definitely one of the churches mentioned in most popular version of the rhyme. May possibly be alluded to in standard version. 1 St Clement Danes 2 St Martin-in-the-Fields 3 St Leonard's, Shoreditch 4 St Mary-le-Bow 5 St Clement's, Eastcheap 6 St Sepulchre-without-Newgate 7 St Martin Orgar 8 St Dunstan's, Stepney

Oranges and lemons,
Say the bells of St. Clement's.

You owe me five farthings,
Say the bells of St. Martin's.

When will you pay me?
Say the bells of Old Bailey.

When I grow rich,
Say the bells of Shoreditch.

When will that be?
Say the bells of Stepney.

I do not know,
Says the great bell of Bow.

Here comes a candle to light you to bed,
And here comes a chopper to chop off your head!
Chip chop chip chop the last man is dead.

== Alternative versions ==
Map of the City of London and surrounding area with locations of churches mentioned in the alternative lyrics. (Click the map to enlarge.) 1 St Pancras Old Church (Fleetditch) 2 St Margaret Lothbury 3 St Helen's Bishopsgate 4 St Botolph's Aldgate 5 St Katharine Cree 6 St Giles in the Fields 7 St Peter upon Cornhill 8 St Paul's Cathedral 9 St John's Chapel, London 10 St Anne and St Agnes 11 Whitechapel Bell Foundry

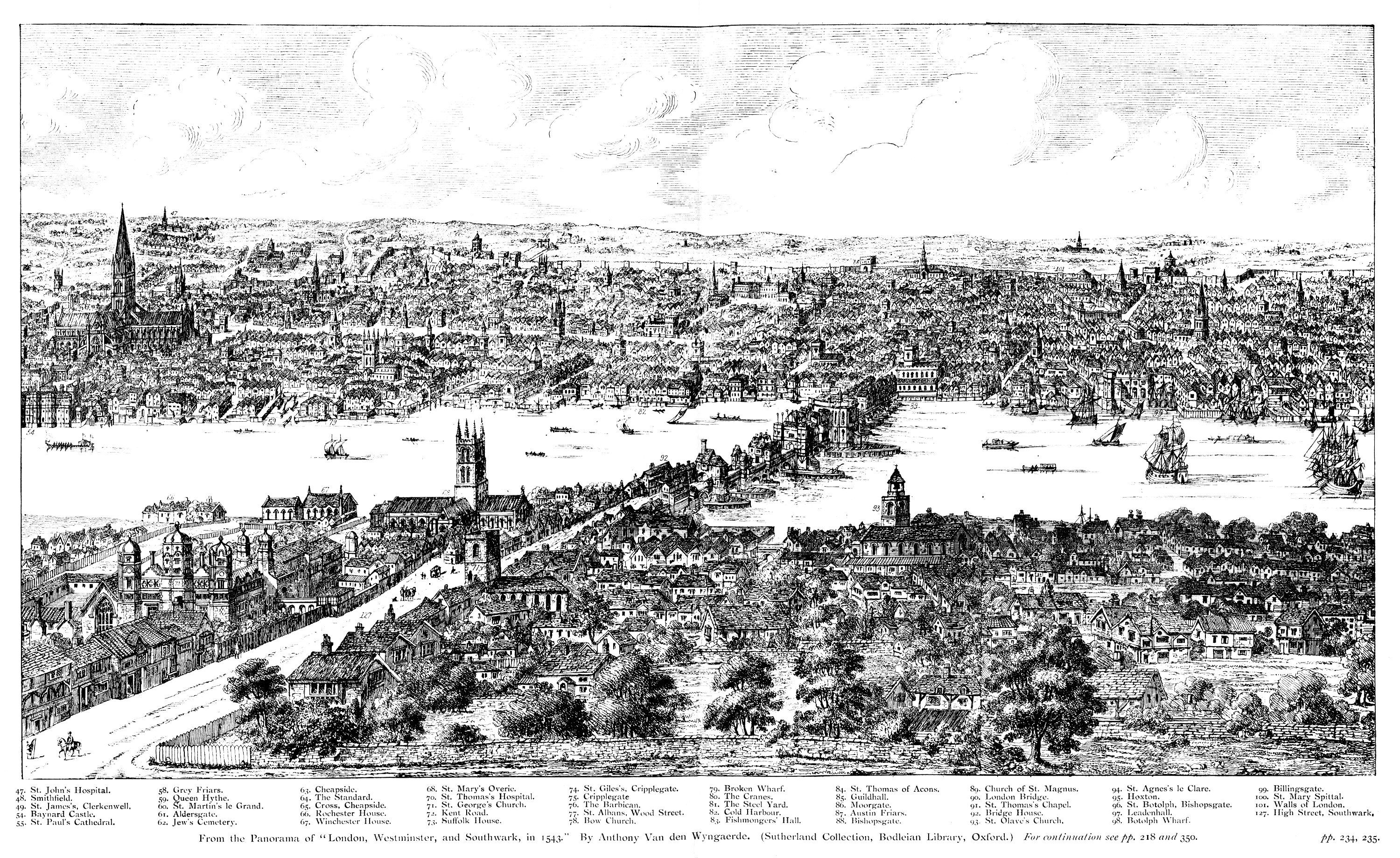
Panorama of London in 1543 from a 19th-century engraving by Nathaniel Whittock from a drawing by Antony van den Wyngaerde (c. 1543–50), showing the towers and spires of many of the churches mentioned in the rhyme

Gay go up, and gay go down,
To ring the bells of London town.

Bull's eyes and targets,
Say the bells of St. Margaret's.

Brickbats and tiles,
Say the bells of St. Giles'.

Halfpence and farthings,
Say the bells of St. Martin's.

Oranges and lemons,
Say the bells of St. Clement's.

Pancakes and fritters,
Say the bells of St. Peter's.

Two sticks and an apple,
Say the bells at Whitechapel.

Pokers and tongs,
Say the bells at St. John's.

Kettles and pans,
Say the bells at St. Ann's.

Old Father Baldpate,
Say the slow bells at Aldgate.

Maids in white Aprons
Say the bells of St Catherine's.

You owe me ten shillings,
Say the bells of St. Helen's.

When will you pay me?
Say the bells at Old Bailey.

When I grow rich,
Say the bells at Shoreditch.

Pray when will that be?
Say the bells of Stepney.

I'm sure I don't know,
Says the great bell at Bow.

Here comes a candle to light you to bed,
And here comes a chopper to chop off your head.

== Melody ==
St Clement Danes

The tune is reminiscent of change ringing, and the intonation of each line is said to correspond with the distinct sounds of each church's bells. Today, the bells of St Clement Danes ring out the tune of the rhyme—as reported in 1940 the church's playing of the tune was interrupted during World War II due to Nazi bombing of the church during the Blitz. As is the case with almost all traditional songs, there were minor variations in the melody. Collector of British folk songs James Madison Carpenter recorded two versions of the song in the 1930s which are now available on the Vaughan Williams Memorial Library website: one in Garsington, Oxfordshire, and another somewhere in either Yorkshire or Lincolnshire. These recordings show slight melodic and lyrical variations.

== As a game ==
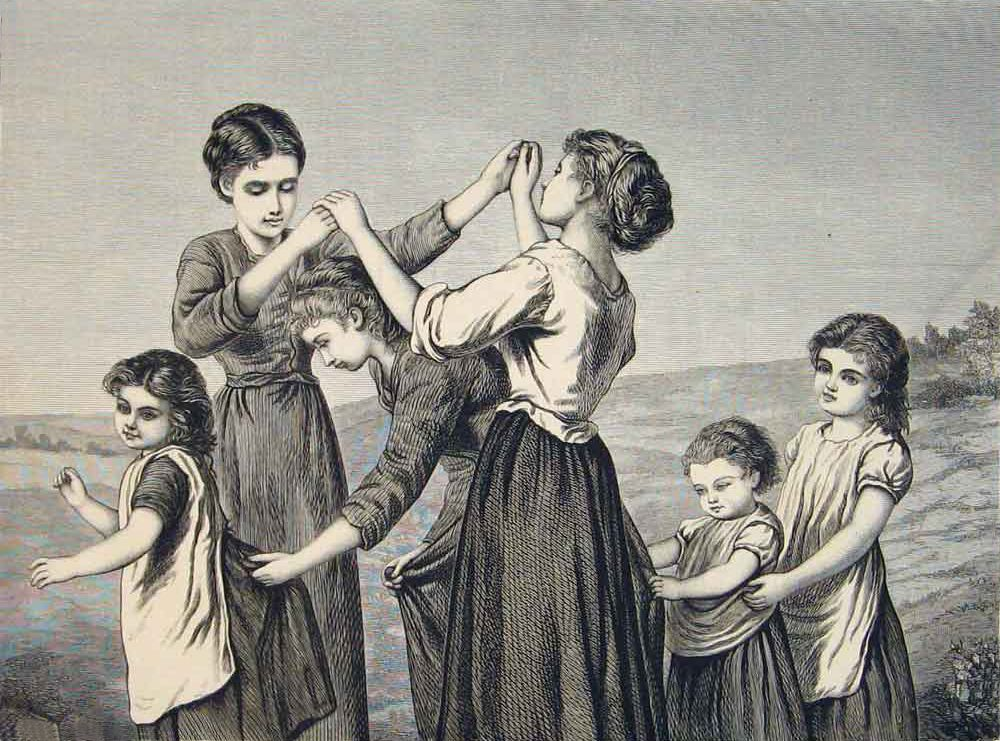
Playing Oranges and Lemons. Picture by Agnes Rose Bouvier Nicholl, 1874

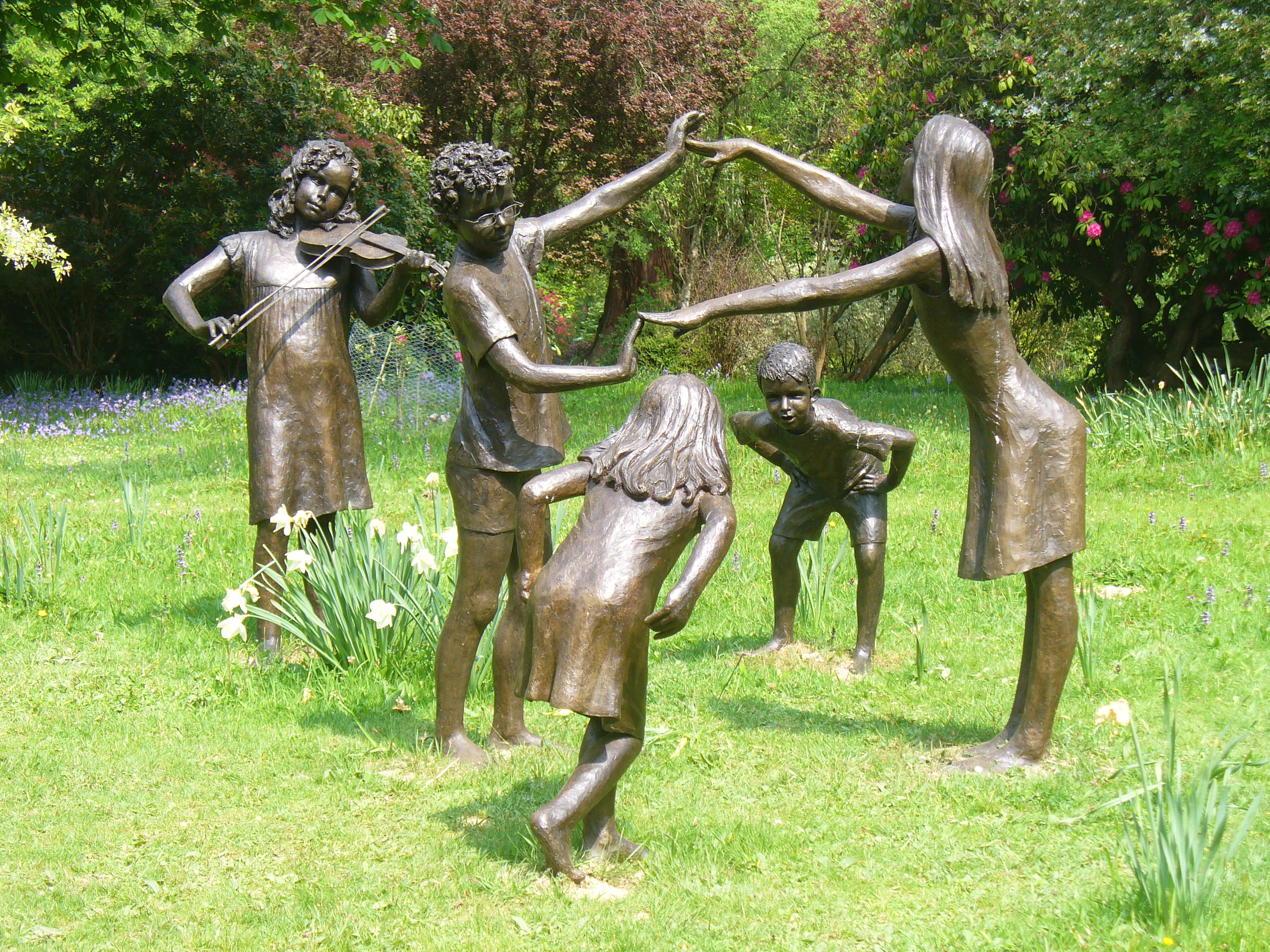
Statue of the game in Surrey, England

The song is used in a children's singing game with the same name, in which the players file, in pairs, through an arch made by two of the players (made by having the players face each other, raise their arms over their head, and clasp their partners' hands). The challenge comes during the final lines beginning "Here comes a chopper to chop off your head"; and on the final repetition of "chop" in the last line, the children forming the arch drop their arms to catch the pair of children currently passing through. These are then "out" and must form another arch next to the existing one. In this way, the series of arches becomes a steadily lengthening tunnel through which each set of two players has to run faster and faster to escape in time.

Alternative versions of the game include: children going through one at a time and when caught "out" by the last rhyme must stand behind one of the children forming the original arch, instead of forming additional arches; and children forming "arches" may bring their hands down for each word of the last line, while the children passing through the arches run as fast as they can to avoid being caught on the last word.

== Origins and meaning ==
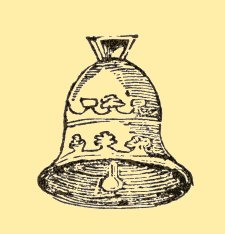
Illustration for the rhyme from The Only True Mother Goose Melodies (1833)

Various theories have been advanced to account for the rhyme, including: that it deals with child sacrifice; that it describes public executions; that it describes Henry VIII's marital difficulties. Problematically for these theories the last two lines, with their different metre, do not appear in the earlier recorded versions of the rhyme, including the first printed in Tommy Thumb's Pretty Song Book (c. 1744), where the lyrics are:

Two Sticks and Apple,
Ring y^{e} Bells at Whitechapple,
Old Father Bald Pate,
Ring y^{e} Bells Aldgate,
Maids in White Aprons,
Ring y^{e} Bells a S^{t.} Catherines,
Oranges and Lemons,
Ring y^{e} bells at S^{t.} Clements,
When will you pay me,
Ring y^{e} Bells at y^{e} Old Bailey,
When I am Rich,
Ring y^{e} Bells at Fleetditch,
When will that be,
Ring y^{e} Bells at Stepney,
When I am Old,
Ring y^{e} Bells at Pauls.

There is considerable variation in the churches and lines attached to them in versions printed in the late eighteenth and early nineteenth centuries, which makes any overall meaning difficult to establish. The final two lines of the modern version were first collected by James Orchard Halliwell in the 1840s.

"Oranges and Lemons" was the title of a square dance, published from the third (1657) edition onwards of The Dancing Master. Similar rhymes naming churches and giving rhymes to their names can be found in other parts of England, including Shropshire and Derby, where they were sung on festival days on which bells would also have been rung.

The identity of the London churches is not always clear, but the following have been suggested, along with some factors that may have influenced the accompanying statements:

- St. Clement's may be St Clement Danes or St Clement Eastcheap, both of which are near the wharves where merchantmen landed citrus fruits.
- St. Martin's may be St Martin Orgar in the City, or St Martin-in-the-Fields near Trafalgar Square. "You owe me five farthings" may refer to the money lenders that operated nearby.
- St Sepulchre-without-Newgate (opposite the Old Bailey) is near the Fleet Prison where debtors were held.
- St Leonard's, Shoreditch is just outside the old City walls.
- St Dunstan's, Stepney is also outside the City walls.
- Bow is St Mary-le-Bow in Cheapside.
- St. Helen's, in the longer version of the song, is St Helen's Bishopsgate, in the City.
- "Whitechapple" may refer to St Mary Matfelon, Whitechapel, or to the Whitechapel Bell Foundry which began making bells in 1570. "Two sticks and an apple" may refer to handbells.
- St. Catherine's is most likely St Katharine Cree, Aldgate. "Maids in white aprons" could be local market-sellers.
- St. Margaret's is St Margaret Lothbury.
- St. Giles' is St Giles Cripplegate.
- St. Peter's is St Peter upon Cornhill. "Pancakes and fritters" may refer to foods sold nearby, as it was a grain market.
- "Fleetditch" is St Pancras Old Church, located near the River Fleet.
- St. John's is St John's Chapel in the Tower of London; "pokers and tongs" may allude to instruments of torture used on prisoners. It could also be St John Clerkenwell.
- St. Anne's is St Anne and St Agnes near the Barbican. "Kettles and pans" may refer to nearby coppersmiths.
- "Aldgate" is St Botolph's Aldgate, while "old father baldpate" refers to the monk Saint Botolph. It may also be an allusion to the glans penis, as St Botolph's was notorious for being a meeting-place for prostitutes.

== Song settings ==
Bob Chilcott's "London Bells", the third movement of his Songs and Cries of London Town (2001) is a setting for choir of the song's version from Tommy Thumb's Pretty Song Book.

Benjamin Till composed music based upon the nursery rhyme which was performed in 2009 at St Mary-le-Bow, London, to commemorate 150 years of the Palace of Westminster's great bell, Big Ben.

== In popular culture ==
- The line, "You owe me five farthings, say the bells of St Martin's", provides the title, and the family name, Farthing, with parents and three children, hence five Farthings, for Monica Redlich's 1939 novel, Five Farthings. The novel is set in London, and several churches are important locations in the story.
- "Oranges and Lemons" and people remembering the words to it is a common motif in George Orwell's 1949 novel Nineteen Eighty-Four.
- "Oranges and Lemons" is a song often referenced in the 2003 children's novel Private Peaceful by Michael Morpurgo.
- "The God Complex", a 2011 episode of Doctor Who, quotes the line "Here comes a candle to light you to bed, here comes a chopper to chop off your head."
- In It, It Chapter Two and It: Welcome to Derry, a creepy rendition of "Oranges and Lemons" plays through the opening logos of both films and also throughout both films and the TV series too especially when Pennywise is around, sung by a then-four-year-old Elodie Barker.

== See also ==
- "London Bridge Is Falling Down", another English nursery rhyme that plays a similar game to "Oranges and Lemons".
- "The Bells of Rhymney", a similar song about church bells, although in Wales as opposed to London and also telling the story of labour disputes in the mining industry. The stanzas follow the pattern of "Oranges and Lemons".
