= Britten's Purcell realizations =

- Songs by Benjamin Britten
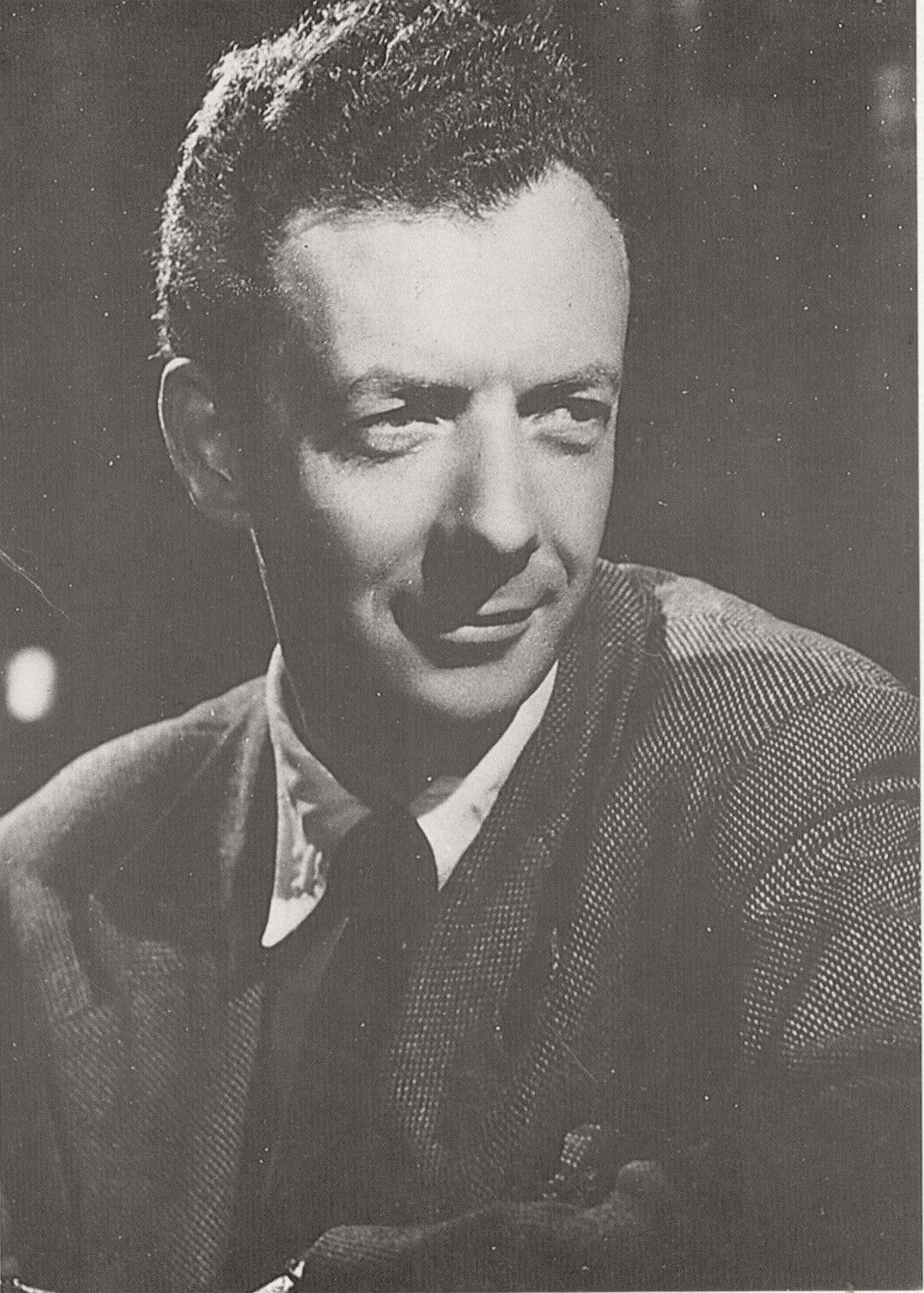
- Benjamin Britten in the 1940s
- Other name: Purcell Songs Realised by Britten
- Based on: Compositions by Henry Purcell
- Composed: 1945 and later
- Scoring: voice; piano

Britten's Purcell realizations is a common name for compositions for voice and piano by Benjamin Britten which are arrangements of works by Henry Purcell. Boosey & Hawkes published 45 of them, titled The Purcell Collection – Realizations by Benjamin Britten. A recording of 40 of them, Purcell Songs Realised by Britten, was released in 2016.

== History ==
In 1945, there was a commemoration of the 250th anniversary of Purcell's death, raising interest in the composer. Britten began that year to arrange songs, duets and a trio by Purcell, writing out—or "realizing"—Purcell's figured bass as an accompaniment for piano, sometimes taking great liberty with the original composition. He chose songs, arias and duets by Purcell, or attributed to him, from Harmonia Sacra, Orpheus Britannicus, The Queen's Epicedium, Dido and Aeneas and The Fairy Queen.

The Britten-Pears Foundation acquired a manuscript of one of the realizations in 2019, a version of The Blessed Virgin's Expostulation which Britten wrote for a concert at Wigmore Hall in 1945. The text, by Nahum Tate, is of Mary's distress when she discovers that her 12-year-old son is missing. It was sung by Margaret Ritchie, to whom the setting is dedicated.

Boosey & Hawkes published 45 of Britten's settings in a volume titled The Purcell Collection – Realizations by Benjamin Britten.

== Recordings ==
Recordings have been dedicated to selections from the realizations. The "complete" set, 40 songs, was recorded in 1995, with nine singers, John Mark Ainsley, Ian Bostridge, James Bowman, Susan Gritton, Richard Jackson, Anthony Rolfe Johnson, Simon Keenlyside, Felicity Lott and Sarah Walker, and pianist Graham Johnson.

Another "complete set", called Purcell Songs Realised by Britten, was recorded in 2016 with singers Robin Blaze, Allan Clayton, Anna Grevelius, Ruby Hughes, Benedict Nelson and Matthew Rose, and pianist Joseph Middleton.
