= Henry Playford =

English music publisher

Henry Playford (1657 – c. 1707) was an English music publisher, the younger son and only known surviving child of John Playford, with whom he entered business.

His father died around 1686, but for some time before that he was in poor health. Henry took on his father's shop near Temple Church 1685–1695, then traded in Temple Change 1695–1704 and finally in Middle Temple Gate in 1706. Many of his publications were of a transient nature and were aimed at favourite songs and instrumental pieces for public entertainments, such as the pleasure garden concerts much in vogue. He revised his father's The Dancing Master and published Thomas d'Urfey's Wit and Mirth and Henry Purcell's Orpheus Britannicus. Among his most significant published song collections are Harmonia sacra (1688) and The Divine Companion (1701).
