= Nathaniel Whittock =

Victorian engraver (1791-1860)

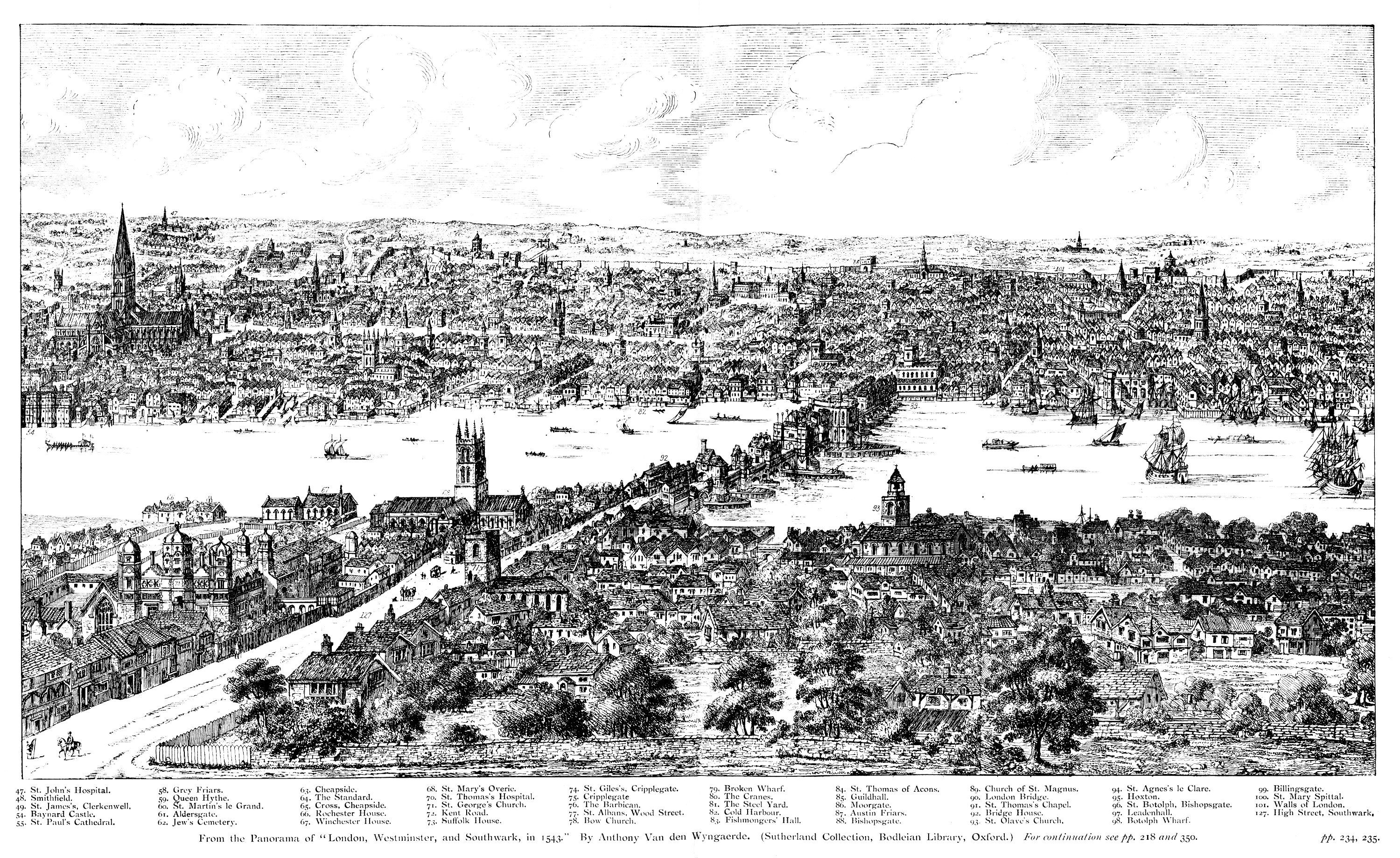
Section from a 19th-century engraving by Nathaniel Whittock from a drawing by Antony van den Wyngaerde (ca 1543–50), which shows the towers and spires of many of the churches mentioned in the rhyme Oranges and Lemons.

Nathaniel Whittock (26 January 1791 – 12 August 1860) was a Victorian topographical engraver, who published bird's-eye views, e.g. of York (1856), Oxford (1834), Melbourne, Australia (1854), Hull (1855), and London (1845, 1849, 1859).

== Life ==
He was born to John and Sarah Whittock in the City of Westminster and was baptised on 6 March 1791 at St John's, Smith Square.

By 1819 he was living in Oxford, where he ran the Oxford Drawing Academy in Oriel Street, teaching ladies on Tuesdays and Thursdays and gentlemen on Mondays, Wednesdays, and Fridays for two hours, charging a guinea every three months. He also had a Painting Room next to the Angel Hotel in the High Street. In 1823 he moved out of his house and shop in the High Street, and the premises were auctioned on 19 June that year. He moved to St Clement’s, a suburb of Oxford. The Oxford Baths were in St Clement’s, and on 6 May 1826 his book A Description of the Oxford Baths and School of Natation was published. In 1824–1829 he appears as "Teacher of Drawing and Perspective, and Lithographist to the University of Oxford", and worked for the University's Ashmolean Museum and scientific community. By October 1827 he had left Oxford, and the contents of his St Clement’s house were sold by auction.

In 1830 and 1831 he was at 24 Garnault Place, Spa Fields, Islington, London. The 1841 census shows him living at 34 Richard Street in Islington with his young nephew Henry Hyde: both were described as engravers. In 1851 he was still at the same address with his wife Ann Whittock, nee Hyde, his nephew and business partner Henry Hyde, and his niece Caroline Hyde.

== Works ==
Whittock was "a prolific writer of instruction books", on drawing and other subjects, such as The decorative painters' and glaziers' guide (1828), On the construction and decoration of the shop fronts of London (1840), and The complete book of trades, or the parents' guide and youths' instructor (1837). The full title of the first of these was:

The decorative painters' and glaziers' guide: containing the most approved methods of imitating oak, mahogany, maple, rose, cedar, coral, and every other kind of fancy wood, Verd Antique, Dove, Sienna, Porphry, white-veined and other marbles, in oil or distemper colour; designs for decorating apartments, in accordance with the various styles of architecture; with directions for stencilling, and process for destroying damp in walls; also a complete body of information on the art of staining and painting on glass; plans for the erection of apparatus for annealing it, and the method for joining figures together by leading, with examples from ancient windows.

As the full title shows, the work was very comprehensive, and the preface "rails against trade secrecy" which the book was intended to dispel. The work has been described as "influential" and "important" and is often cited by modern scholars of interior decoration.

- Whittock, Nathaniel (1826). "Lithographs". A description of the Oxford baths, and school of natation. By Richardson, Andrew Hude. Oxford: A.H. Richardson.
- Whittock, Nathaniel (1827). The decorative painters' and glaziers' guide. London: Isaac Taylor Hinton.
- Whittock, Nathaniel (1828–1833). "Illustrations". A new and complete history of the county of York. By Allen, Thomas. Vol. 1–3. London: I.T. Hinton.
- Whittock, Nathaniel (1829). A Topographical and Historical Description of the University and City of Oxford. London: Isaac Taylor Hinton.
- Whittock, Nathaniel (1829). The art of drawing and colouring from nature : flowers, fruit, and shells. London: Isaac Taylor Hinton.
- Whittock, Nathaniel (1830). The art of drawing and colouring from nature : birds, beasts, fishes, and insects. London: Isaac Taylor Hinton.
- Whittock, Nathaniel (1830). The microcosm of Oxford. London: J. Bumpus, Hinton and Co.
- Whittock, Nathaniel (1833). The Youth's New London Self-instructing Drawing Book, in Colours. London: George Virtue.
- Whittock, Nathaniel (1835) [1829]. The Oxford drawing book, or, The art of drawing. London: Edward Lacey.
- Whittock, Nathaniel (1840). On the construction and decoration of the shop fronts of London. London: Sherwood, Gilbert, and Piper.
- Whittock, Nathaniel (1846). The miniature painter's manual. London: Sherwood, Gilbert, and Piper.
- Whittock, Nathaniel (1846). A picturesque guide through Dublin. Dublin: J. Cornish.
