= Edward Purcell (musician) =

English composer (1689–1740); son of Henry Purcell

Edward Purcell (1689–1740) was an English organist and composer.

Purcell was born in Westminster, London, the only surviving son of English Baroque master Henry Purcell, who died in 1695 when Edward was a small child. When his mother Frances died in February 1706, she stated in her will, and apparently in accordance with her husband's wishes, that she had given him a good education. She also bequeathed to him music and instruments: "the organ, the double spinnet, the single spinnet"; possibly the instruments her husband had used.

Edward became organist of St Clement Eastcheap, in London at the end of 1711, a position he retained for the rest of his life. He was unsuccessful in his attempts to succeed his uncle Daniel Purcell as organist of St Andrew's, Holborn, on 19 February 1718 and again on 3 April 1719.

He eventually became organist at St. Margaret's, Westminster, on 8 July 1726, concurrent with his post at Eastcheap.

In 1739, the year before his death, he was one of the founder-members of the London-based musicians' benevolent society then known as the Society of Musicians (later to become the Royal Society of Musicians). He was buried in St Clement Eastcheap near the organ gallery door, and was succeeded as organist there by his son Edward Henry Purcell (d. 1765).

Edward Purcell published two songs, though the psalm chants often attributed to him seem to be by an earlier namesake, perhaps his uncle Edward.
