= Henry Purcell =

English composer (1659–1695)

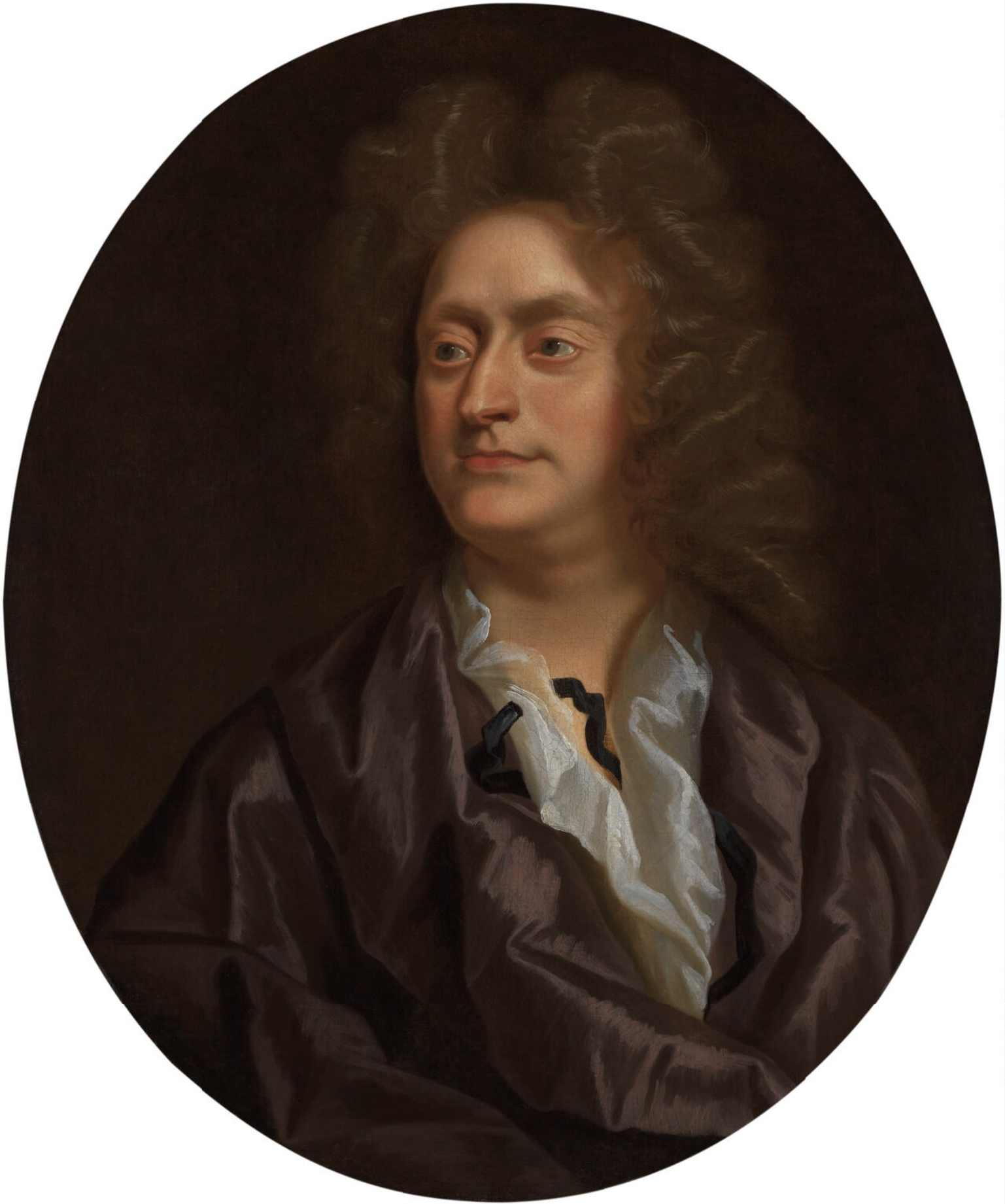
- Portrait attributed to the studio of John Closterman, c. 1695
- Born: 10 September 1659; London, England
- Died: 21 November 1695 (aged 36); London, England
- Education: Westminster School
- Era: Baroque
- Works: List of compositions
- Children: 6, including Edward
- Relatives: Edward Henry Purcell (grandson)

Henry Purcell (/ˈpɜːrsəl/, rare: /pərˈsɛl/; (Note: The contemporaneous pronunciation was always with the stress on the first syllable. The stress on the second syllable is sometimes heard today, as mentioned by the Longman Pronunciation Dictionary, but it and the Oxford Companion to Music emphasise that stress on the first syllable is the standard pronunciation in both the United Kingdom and North America. The stress on the second syllable is so rare that some English dictionaries do not even mention it, such as the Collins English Dictionary and the Oxford Learner's Dictionary.) c. 10 September 1659 (Note: During Purcell's lifetime, England and Ireland observed the Julian calendar. According to Holman & Thompson (2001), there is uncertainty regarding the year and day of birth. No record of baptism has been found. The year 1659 is based on Purcell's memorial tablet in Westminster Abbey and the frontispiece of his Sonnata's of III. Parts (London, 1683). The day 10 September is based on vague inscriptions in the manuscript GB-Cfm 88. It may also be relevant that he was appointed to his first salaried post on 10 September 1677, which would have been his 18th birthday.) – 21 November 1695) was an English composer and organist of the middle Baroque era. He was extremely prolific, his compositions including more than 100 songs, the tragic opera Dido and Aeneas, and incidental music to a version of Shakespeare's A Midsummer Night's Dream called The Fairy Queen.

Purcell's musical style was uniquely English, although it incorporated Italian and French elements. Purcell is generally considered to be one of the greatest English composers.

== Life and work ==
=== Early life ===
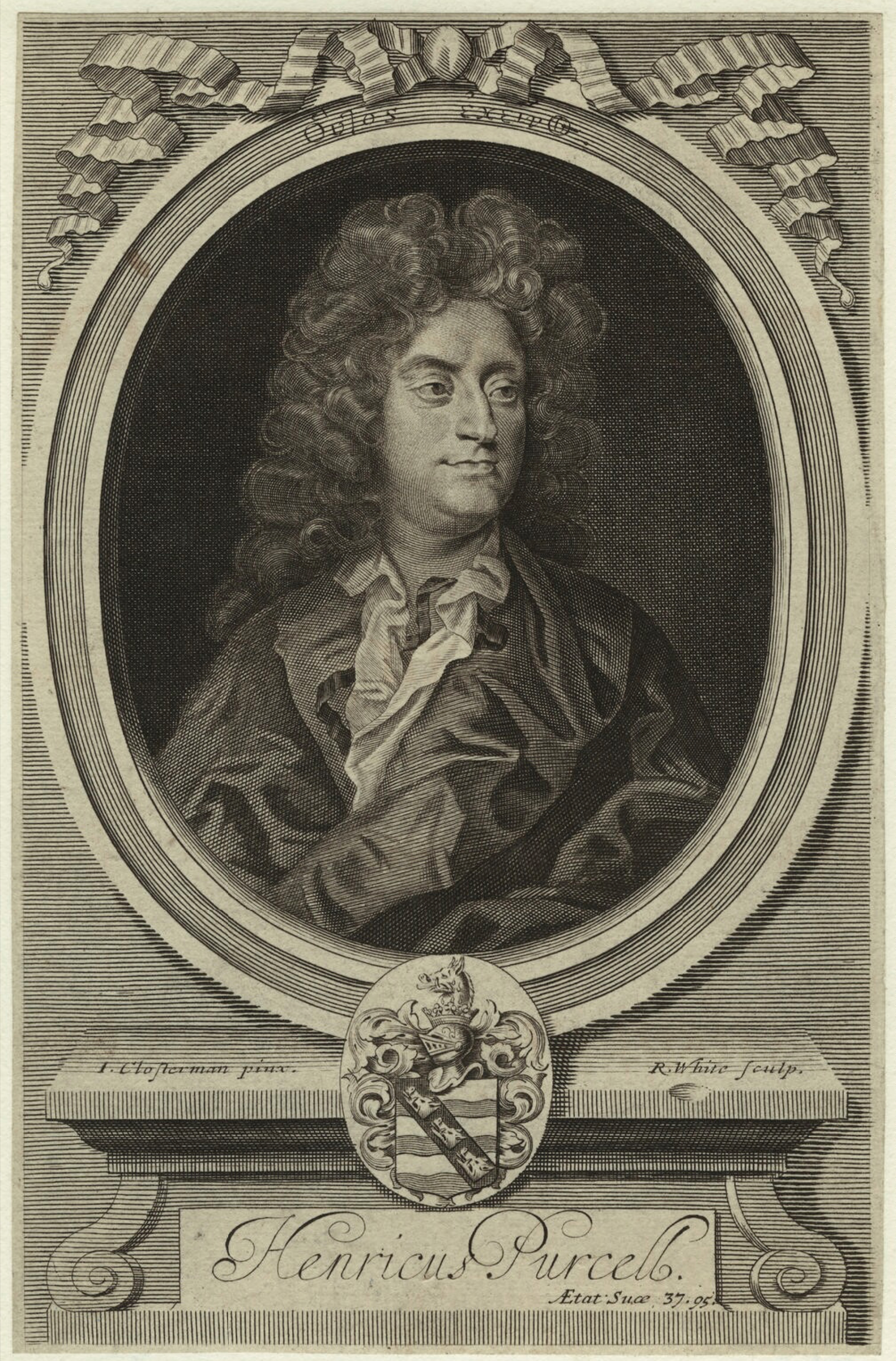
Engraved portrait of Purcell by R. White after Closterman, from Orpheus Britannicus

Purcell was born in St Ann's Lane, Old Pye Street, Westminster, in 1659. From that year onwards the family lived just a few hundred yards west of Westminster Abbey. The father, also Henry Purcell, had an older brother Thomas who was a musician, a gentleman of the Chapel Royal who sang at the coronation of King Charles II of England. The elder Henry had three sons: Edward, Henry and Daniel. The latter, the youngest, also became a prolific composer and after his brother Henry's death wrote the music for much of the final act of The Indian Queen.

After their father's death in 1664, the infant Henry was placed under the guardianship of his uncle Thomas, who showed him great affection and kindness. Thomas arranged for Henry to be admitted as a chorister and to study first under the composer Captain Henry Cooke, Master of the Children, and afterwards under Cooke's successor Pelham Humfrey, who had been a pupil of Lully. The composer Matthew Locke was a family friend and, particularly with his semi-operas, probably also had a musical influence on the young Henry. When Henry's voice broke in 1673, he left his post as a chorister in the Chapel Royal and became an assistant to the organ-builder John Hingston, who held the post of keeper of wind instruments to the King.

=== Early career ===
Purcell is said to have been composing at nine years old, but the earliest work that can be identified as his with certainty is an ode for the King's birthday, written in 1670, when he was eleven. In general, the dates for his compositions are often uncertain, despite the considerable research that has been undertaken. It is assumed that the three-part song Sweet tyranness, I now resign was written by him as a child. After his teacher Humfrey's death, Purcell continued his studies under John Blow. Henry was a pupil at Westminster School and in 1676 was appointed copyist at Westminster Abbey. His earliest known anthem, Lord, who can tell, was composed in 1678. The text is a psalm that is prescribed for Christmas Day and also to be read at morning prayer on the fourth day of the month.

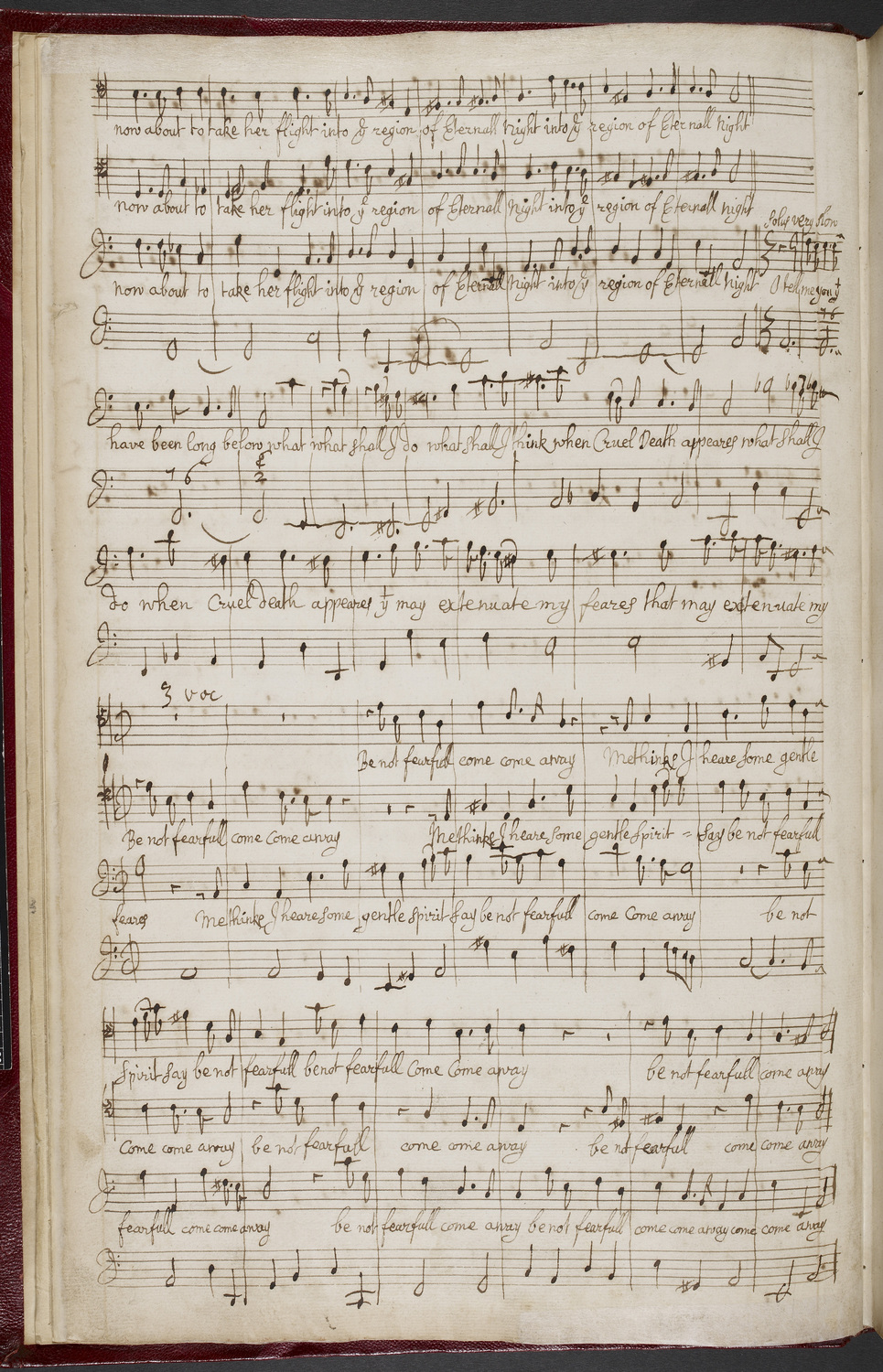
Purcell's manuscript copy of When on my sick bed I languish (c. 1680)

In 1679, he wrote songs for John Playford's Choice Ayres, Songs and Dialogues and an anthem, the name of which is unknown, for the Chapel Royal. From an extant letter written by his uncle Thomas Purcell, we learn that this anthem was composed for the exceptionally fine voice of the Rev. John Gostling, who was then at Canterbury, but afterwards became a gentleman of His Majesty's Chapel. Purcell wrote several anthems at different times for Gostling's extraordinary basso profondo voice, which is known to have had a range of at least two full octaves, from D below the bass staff to the D above it. The dates of very few of these sacred compositions are known; perhaps the most notable example is the anthem They that go down to the sea in ships. In gratitude for the providential escape of King Charles II from shipwreck, Gostling, who had been of the royal party, put together some verses from the Psalms in the form of an anthem and requested Purcell to set them to music. The challenging work opens with a passage which traverses the full extent of Gostling's range, beginning on the upper D and descending two octaves to the lower.

=== Dido and Aeneas ===
Between 1680 and 1688, Purcell wrote music for seven plays. The composition of his chamber opera Dido and Aeneas, which forms a very important landmark in the history of English dramatic music, has been attributed to this period, and its earliest production may well have predated the documented one of 1689. It was written to a libretto furnished by Nahum Tate, and performed in 1689 in cooperation with Josias Priest, a dancing master and the choreographer for the Dorset Garden Theatre. Priest's wife kept a boarding school for young gentlewomen, first in Leicester Fields and afterwards at Chelsea, where the opera was performed. It is occasionally considered the first genuine English opera, though that title is usually given to Blow's Venus and Adonis: as in Blow's work, the action does not progress in spoken dialogue but in Italian-style recitative. Each work runs to less than one hour. At the time, Dido and Aeneas never found its way to the theatre, though it appears to have been very popular in private circles. It is believed to have been extensively copied, but only one song was printed by Purcell's widow in Orpheus Britannicus, and the complete work remained in manuscript until 1840 when it was printed by the Musical Antiquarian Society under the editorship of Sir George Macfarren. The composition of Dido and Aeneas gave Purcell his first chance to write a sustained musical setting of a dramatic text. It was his only opportunity to compose a work in which the music carried the entire drama. The story of Dido and Aeneas derives from the original source in Virgil's epic the Aeneid. During the early part of 1679, he produced two important works for the stage, the music for Nathaniel Lee's Theodosius, and Thomas d'Urfey's Virtuous Wife.

In 1679, Blow, who had been appointed organist of Westminster Abbey 10 years before, resigned his office in favour of Purcell. Purcell now devoted himself almost entirely to the composition of sacred music, and for six years severed his connection with the theatre. He had probably written his two important stage works before taking up his new office.

=== Westminster Abbey and Chapel Royal ===
Soon after Purcell's marriage in 1682, on the death of Edward Lowe, he was appointed organist of the Chapel Royal, an office which he was able to hold simultaneously with his position at Westminster Abbey. His eldest son was born in this same year, but he was short-lived. His first printed composition, Twelve Sonatas, was published in 1683. For some years after this, he was busy in the production of sacred music, odes addressed to the king and royal family, and other similar works. In 1685, he wrote two of his finest anthems, I was glad and My heart is inditing, for the coronation of King James II. In 1690 he composed a setting of the birthday ode for Queen Mary, Arise, my muse and four years later wrote one of his most elaborate, important and magnificent works – a setting for another birthday ode for the Queen, written by Nahum Tate, entitled Come Ye Sons of Art.

=== Theatre music ===
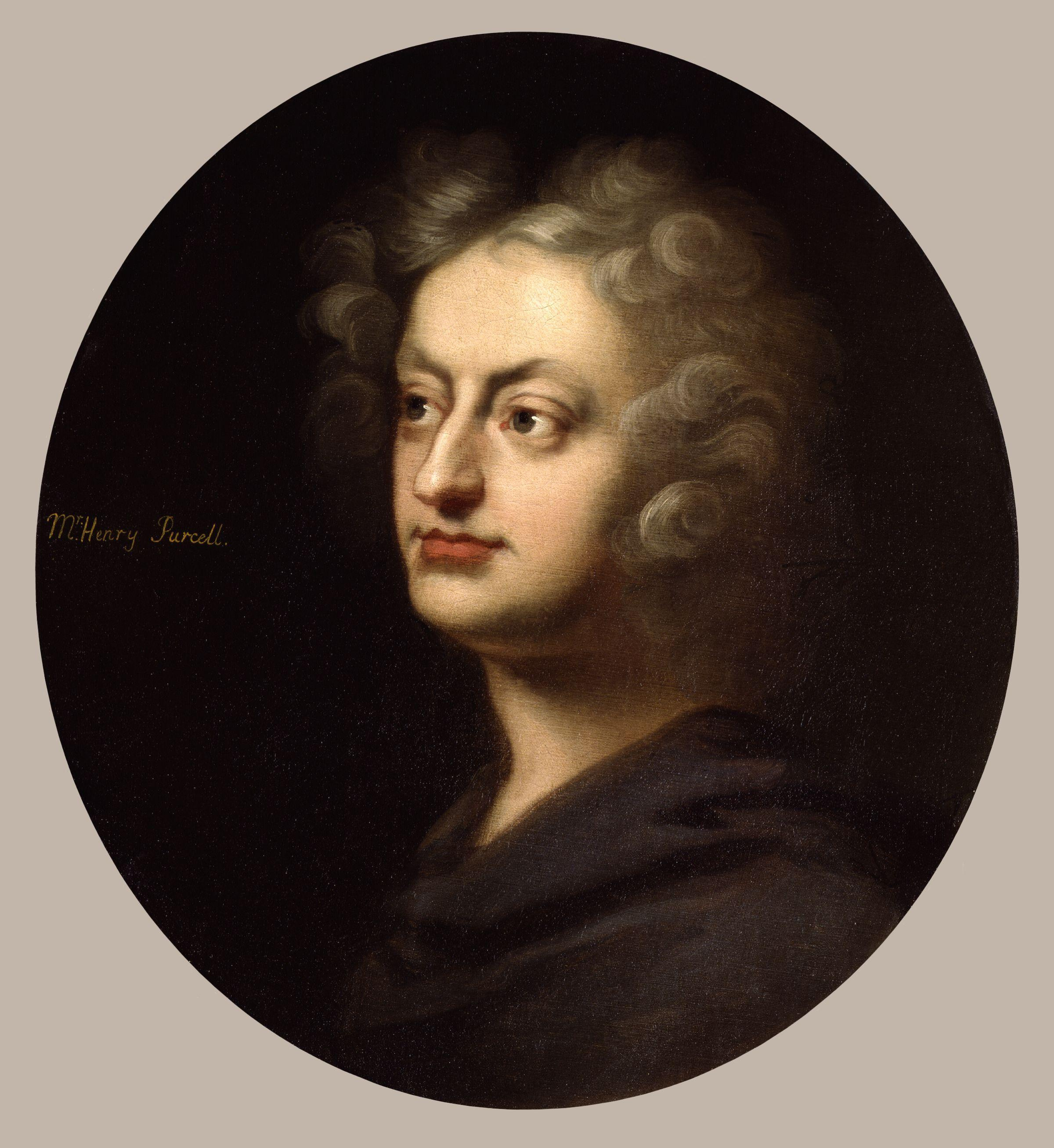
Henry Purcell by John Closterman

In 1687, he resumed his connection with the theatre by furnishing the music for John Dryden's tragedy Tyrannick Love. In this year, Purcell also composed a march and passepied called Quick-step, which became so popular that Lord Wharton adapted the latter to the verses of Lillibullero. In or before January 1688, Purcell composed his anthem Blessed are they that fear the Lord by the express command of the King. A few months later, he wrote the music for D'Urfey's play, The Fool's Preferment. In 1690, he composed the music for Betterton's adaptation of Fletcher and Massinger's Prophetess (afterwards called Dioclesian) and Dryden's Amphitryon. In 1691, he wrote the music for what is sometimes considered his dramatic masterpiece, King Arthur, or The British Worthy. In 1692, he composed The Fairy-Queen (an adaptation of Shakespeare's A Midsummer Night's Dream), the score of which (his longest for theatre) was rediscovered in 1901 and published by the Purcell Society. The Indian Queen followed in 1695, in which year he also wrote songs for Dryden and Davenant's version of Shakespeare's The Tempest (recently, this has been disputed by music scholars), probably including "Full fathom five" and "Come unto these yellow sands". The Indian Queen was adapted from a tragedy by Dryden and Sir Robert Howard. In these semi-operas (another term for which at the time was "dramatic opera"), the main characters of the plays do not sing but speak their lines: the action moves in dialogue rather than recitative. The related songs are sung "for" them by singers, who have minor dramatic roles.

In Nomine à6, Z.746 for Treble, Tenor & Bass Viols

In Nomine à7, Z.747 for Treble, Tenor & Bass Viols
Performed by Phillip W. Serna, Treble, Tenor & Bass Viols

I was Glad

Ode 1 – Sinfonia

Ode 2 – Welcome to All

Ode 3 – Hail to this Happy Assembly

Ode 4 – Here the Deities Approve

Ode 5 – While Joys Celestial

Ode 6 – Then Lift Up Your Voices

Ode 7 – Beauty, Thou Scene of Love

Ode 8 – In a Consort of Voices

Toccata in A major
Performed by Sylvia Kind

"The Queen's Dolour (A Farewell)"
Realised by Ronald Stevenson (1958), performed live by Mark Gasser

=== Last works ===
Purcell's Te Deum and Jubilate Deo were written for Saint Cecilia's Day, 1694, the first English Te Deum ever composed with orchestral accompaniment. This work was annually performed at St Paul's Cathedral until 1712, after which it was performed alternately with Handel's Utrecht Te Deum and Jubilate until 1743, when both works were replaced by Handel's Dettingen Te Deum.

He composed an anthem and two elegies for Queen Mary II's funeral, his Funeral Sentences and Music for the Funeral of Queen Mary. Besides the operas and semi-operas already mentioned, Purcell wrote the music and songs for Thomas d'Urfey's The Comical History of Don Quixote, Bonduca, The Indian Queen and others, a vast quantity of sacred music, and numerous odes, cantatas, and other miscellaneous pieces. The quantity of his instrumental chamber music is minimal after his early career, and his keyboard music consists of an even more minimal number of harpsichord suites and organ pieces. In 1693, Purcell composed music for two comedies: The Old Bachelor, and The Double Dealer. Purcell also composed for five other plays within the same year. In July 1695, Purcell composed an ode for the Duke of Gloucester for his sixth birthday. The ode is titled Who can from joy refrain? Purcell's four-part sonatas were issued in 1697. In the final six years of his life, Purcell wrote music for forty-two plays.

=== Death ===
Purcell died on 21 November 1695 at his home in Marsham Street, (Note: Often miscited as Dean's Yard; Frederick Bridge in his brief biography of 1920, Twelve Good Composers, uses rental information/rate sheets to clear this up.) at the height of his career. He is believed to have been 35 or 36 years old at the time. The cause of his death is unclear: one theory is that he caught a chill after returning home late from the theatre one night to find that his wife had locked him out. Another is that he died of tuberculosis. The beginning of Purcell's will reads:

In the name of God Amen. I, Henry Purcell, of the City of Westminster, gentleman, being dangerously ill as to the constitution of my body, but in good and perfect mind and memory (thanks be to God) do by these presents publish and declare this to be my last Will and Testament. And I do hereby give and bequeath unto my loving wife, Frances Purcell, all my estate both real and personal of what nature and kind soever...

Purcell is buried adjacent to the organ in Westminster Abbey. The music that he had earlier composed for Queen Mary's funeral was performed during his funeral. Purcell was universally mourned as "a very great master of music". Following his death, the officials at Westminster honoured him by unanimously voting that he be buried with no expense spared in the north aisle of the Abbey. His epitaph reads: "Here lyes Henry Purcell Esq., who left this life and is gone to that Blessed Place where only His harmony can be exceeded."

Purcell and his wife Frances had six children, four of whom died in infancy. His wife, as well as his son Edward (1689–1740) and daughter Frances, survived him. His wife Frances died in 1706, having published a number of her husband's works, including the now-famous collection called Orpheus Britannicus, in two volumes, printed in 1698 and 1702, respectively. Edward was appointed organist of St Clement's, Eastcheap, London, in 1711 and was succeeded by his son Edward Henry Purcell (died 1765). Both men were buried in St Clement's near the organ gallery.

== Legacy ==
=== Notable compositions ===
Purcell worked in many genres, both in works closely linked to the court, such as symphony song, to the Chapel Royal, such as the symphony anthem, and the theatre.

Among Purcell's most notable works are his opera Dido and Aeneas (1688), his semi-operas Dioclesian (1690), King Arthur (1691), The Fairy-Queen (1692) and Timon of Athens (1695), as well as the compositions Hail! Bright Cecilia (1692), Come Ye Sons of Art (1694) and Funeral Sentences and Music for the Funeral of Queen Mary (1695).

In 2025, a lost work, the song As Soon as Day Began To Peep from Thomas D'Urfey's 1691 play Love for Money, was rediscovered in the Worcestershire County Archives; it was unknown to modern scholars. Announced at the same time was the rediscovery in Norfolk County Archives of manuscripts of three keyboard works in Purcell's own hand, including early versions of his G minor suite, different from the published work.

=== Influence and reputation ===
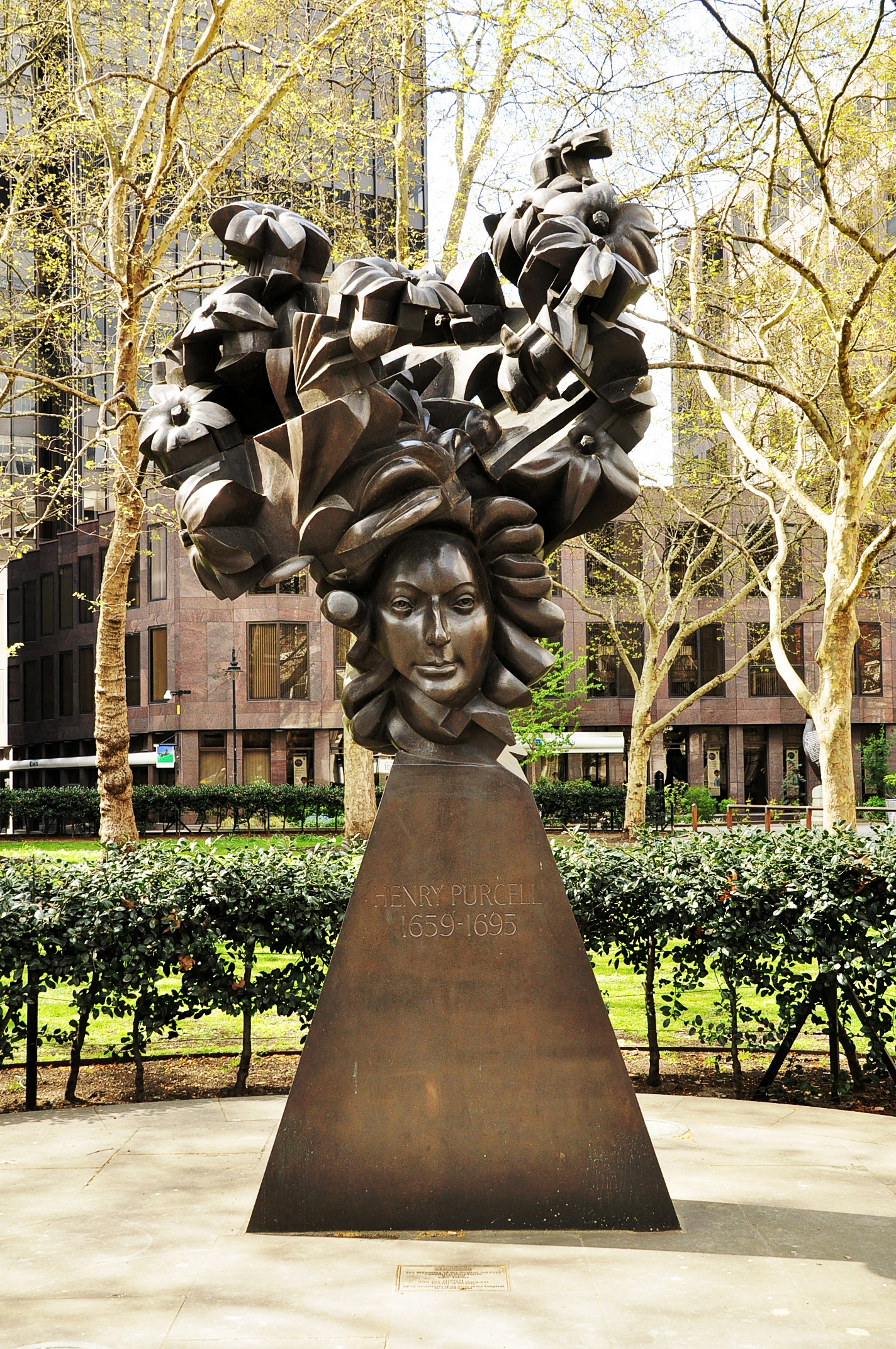
"The Flowering of the English Baroque", bronze memorial sculpture by Glynn Williams in a small park on Victoria St, Westminster

After his death, Purcell was honoured by many of his contemporaries, including his old friend John Blow, who wrote An Ode, on the Death of Mr. Henry Purcell (Mark how the lark and linnet sing) with text by his old collaborator, John Dryden. Jeremiah Clarke also composed an Ode on the Death of Henry Purcell (Come, Come Along for a Dance and a Song). William Croft's 1724 setting for the Burial Service was written in the style of "the great Master". Croft preserved Purcell's setting of "Thou knowest Lord" (Z 58) in his service, for reasons "obvious to any artist"; it has been sung at every British state funeral ever since. More recently, the English poet Gerard Manley Hopkins wrote a famous sonnet entitled simply "Henry Purcell", with a headnote reading: "The poet wishes well to the divine genius of Purcell and praises him that, whereas other musicians have given utterance to the moods of man's mind, he has, beyond that, uttered in notes the very make and species of man as created both in him and in all men generally."

Purcell also had a strong influence on the composers of the English musical renaissance of the early 20th century, most notably Benjamin Britten, who arranged many of Purcell's vocal works for voice(s) and piano in Britten's Purcell Realizations, including from Dido and Aeneas, and whose The Young Person's Guide to the Orchestra is based on a theme from Purcell's Abdelazar. Stylistically, the aria "I know a bank" from Britten's opera A Midsummer Night's Dream is clearly inspired by Purcell's aria "Sweeter than Roses", which Purcell originally wrote as part of incidental music to Richard Norton's Pausanias, the Betrayer of His Country.

In a 1940 interview Ignaz Friedman stated that he considered Purcell as great as Bach and Beethoven. In Victoria Street, Westminster, England, there is a bronze monument to Purcell, sculpted by Glynn Williams and unveiled in 1995 to mark the 300th anniversary of his death. In 2009, Purcell was selected by the Royal Mail for their "Eminent Britons" commemorative postage stamp issue.

A Purcell Club was founded in London in 1836 for promoting the performance of his music but was dissolved in 1863. In 1876 a Purcell Society was founded, which published new editions of his works. A modern-day Purcell Club has been created, and provides guided tours and concerts in support of Westminster Abbey.

Today there is a Henry Purcell Society of Boston, which performs his music in live concert. There is a Purcell Society in London, which collects and studies Purcell manuscripts and musical scores, concentrating on producing revised versions of the scores of all his music. Purcell's works have been catalogued by Franklin Zimmerman, who gave them a number preceded by Z.

So strong was his reputation that a popular wedding processional was incorrectly attributed to Purcell for many years. The so-called Purcell's Trumpet Voluntary was in fact written around 1700 by a British composer named Jeremiah Clarke as the Prince of Denmark's March.

=== In popular culture ===
Lea Desandre and Les Arts Florissants perform the "Dido's Lament" aria from Purcell's Dido and Aeneas, among his most notable works.

Music for the Funeral of Queen Mary was reworked by Wendy Carlos for the title music of the 1971 film by Stanley Kubrick, A Clockwork Orange. The 1973 Rolling Stone review of Jethro Tull's A Passion Play compared the musical style of the album with that of Purcell. In 2009 Pete Townshend of The Who, an English rock band that established itself in the 1960s, identified Purcell's harmonies, particularly the use of suspension and resolution (Townshend has mentioned Chaconne from The Gordian Knot Untied) that he had learned from producer Kit Lambert, as an influence on the band's music (in songs such as "Won't Get Fooled Again" (1971), "I Can See for Miles" (1967) and the very Purcellian intro to "Pinball Wizard"). Purcell's music was widely featured as background music in the Academy Award winning 1979 film Kramer vs. Kramer, with a soundtrack on CBS Masterworks Records. The 1995 film England, My England tells the story of an actor who is himself writing a play about Purcell's life and music, and features many of his compositions.

In the 21st century, the soundtrack of the 2005 film version of Pride and Prejudice features a dance titled "A Postcard to Henry Purcell". This is a version by composer Dario Marianelli of Purcell's Abdelazar theme. In the German-language 2004 movie, Downfall, the music of Dido's Lament is used repeatedly as Nazi Germany collapses. The 2012 film Moonrise Kingdom contains Benjamin Britten's version of the Rondeau in Purcell's Abdelazar created for his 1946 The Young Person's Guide to the Orchestra. In 2013, the Pet Shop Boys released their single "Love Is a Bourgeois Construct" incorporating one of the same ground basses from King Arthur used by Michael Nyman in his The Draughtsman's Contract score. Olivia Chaney performs her adaptation of "There's Not a Swain" on her CD "The Longest River". The song "Music for a while" from Purcell's incidental music to Oedipus, Z. 583 was included in the soundtrack of the 2018 film The Favourite, along with the second movement of his Trumpet Sonata in D major, Z. 850, performed by the English Baroque Soloists, conducted by Sir John Eliot Gardiner.

"What Power Art Thou" (from King Arthur, or The British Worthy (Z. 628), a semi-opera in five acts with music by Purcell and a libretto by John Dryden) is featured in The Crown.

Cultural offices
Preceded by John Blow	Organist and Master of the Choristers of Westminster Abbey; 1679–1695	Succeeded by John Blow (re-appointed)
