= List of compositions by Orlando Gibbons =

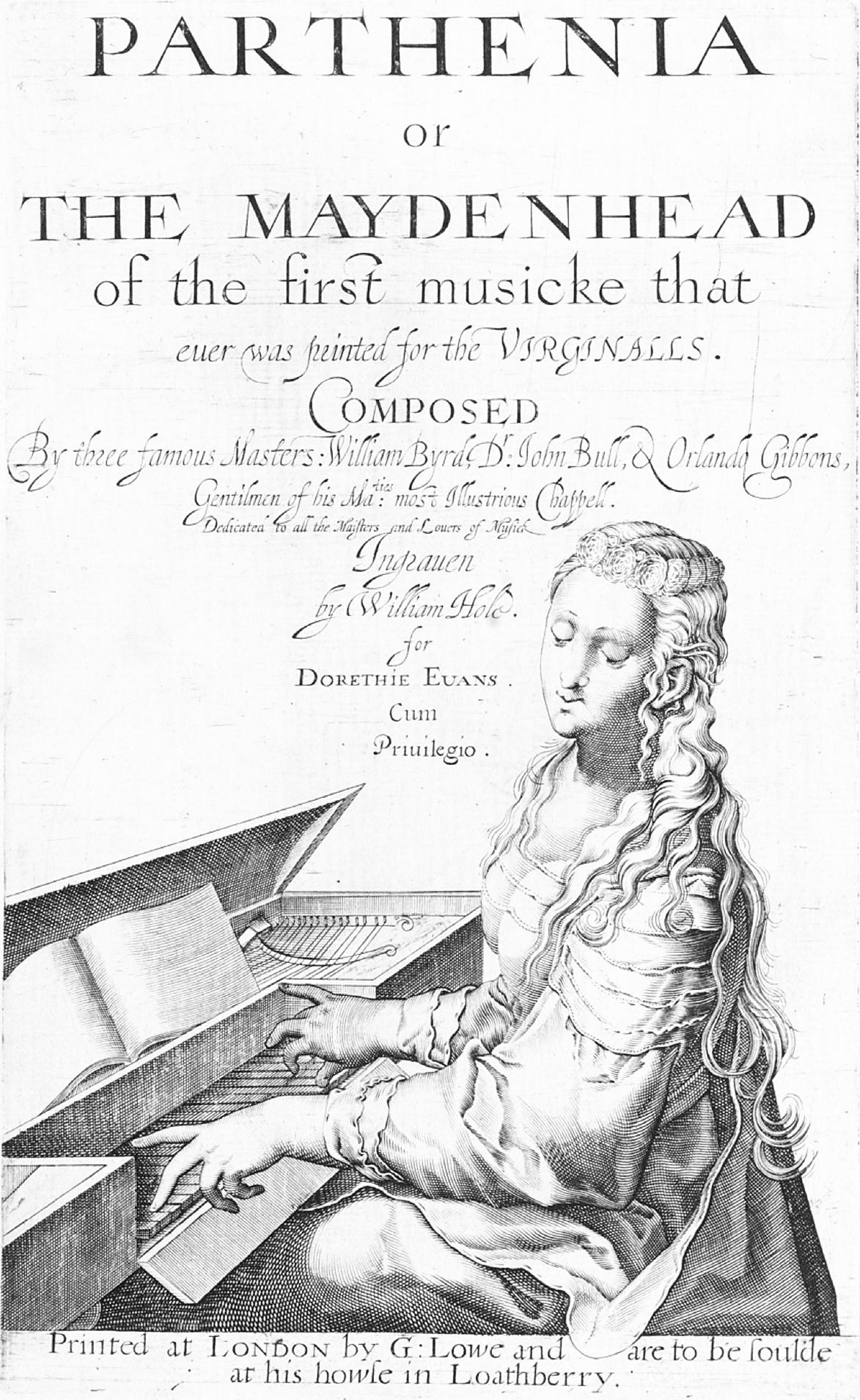
Parthenia, the first collection of published English Keyboard music, of which Gibbons contributed 6 works

The compositions of Orlando Gibbons (1583–1625) include works in virtually every genre of the Elizabethan and Jacobean eras. Due to his sudden and early death, Gibbons' output was not as large as that of his older contemporary William Byrd, but he still managed to produce various secular and sacred polyphonic vocal works, including consort songs, services, more than 40 full anthems and verse anthems, a set of 20 madrigals as well as at least 20 keyboard works and various instrumental ensemble pieces including nearly 30 fantasies for viols. He is well known for the 5-part verse anthem This is the Record of John, the 8-part full anthem O Clap Your Hands Together, 2 settings of Evensong and what is often thought to be the best known English madrigal: The Silver Swan.

== List of compositions ==
=== Sacred Vocal works ===
==== Services ====
* Incomplete or lost work

Full Anthems
Title	Type	Voices	Instruments	Text	Occasion	Reference
Short (First) Service in F (Note: With no formal name, this work is also often referred to as "Short (First) Service," "First Service in F" and "The Short Service.")	Full	SATB	A cappella	Psalm 95, Te Deum, Benedictus Deus Israel, Credo, Magnificat, and Nunc dimittis.	-	EECM CPDL
Second (Verse) Service in D minor (Note: With no formal name, this work is also often referred to as "Second (Verse Service" and "Verse (Second) Service.")	Verse	SAATB	Organ (Note: Usually used, but likely not by Gibbons)	Te Deum, Jubilate, Magnificat, and Nunc dimittis.	-	EECM
First Preces and Psalms	Verse	SAATB	A cappella	cxlv. 15–21 (Note: "The eyes of all wait upon thee.")	Evensong on Whitsunday	EECM
First Preces and Psalm	Verse	SAATB	A cappella	lvii. 9–12 – cxviii. 19–24 (Note: "Awake up, my glory – Open to me the gates.")	Evensong on Easter Day	EECM
Second Preces and Psalm	Full	SAATB	A cappella	cxlv. 1–14 (Note: "I will magnify thee, O God my king.")	-	EECM CPDL

===== Adaptations =====
Adaptations
Title	Voices	Text	Reference
Te Deum from Short (First) Service			EECM

Doubtful Attributions
Title	Voices	Author	Reference
Te Deum		William Byrd	EECM

==== Full Anthems ====
* Incomplete or lost work

Full Anthems
Title	Voices	Text	Reference
Almighty and everlasting God	SATB	Collect for the Third Sunday after Epiphany	EECM 21/1 CPDL
Deliver us, O Lord (Note: "Blessed be the Lord" is the second part.CPDL)	SAATB	Psalm cvi.47–48	EECM 21/2 CPDL
Hosanna to the Son of David	SSAATTB	Matthew xxi.9, Mark xi.10 and Luke xix.38	EECM 21/3 CPDL
I am the resurrection	SAATB	John xi.25–26	EECM 21/4
Lift up your heads	SSAATB	Psalm 24. 7–8, 10	EECM 21/5CPDL
O clap your hands (Note: "God is gone up" is the second part. CPDL)	SSAATTBB	Psalm 47 (Note: Omits the first half of verse 9.)	EECM 21/6CPDL
O Lord, how do my woes increase (Note: Published in Sir William Leighton's 1614 publication: The Teares and Lamentatacions of a Sorrowfull Soule.)	SATB	Psalm 3:1-2 (Note: Paraphrase on this Psalm.)	EECM 11/24 CPDL
O Lord, I lift my heart to thee (Note: Published in Sir William Leighton's 1614 publication: The Teares and Lamentatacions of a Sorrowfull Soule.)	AATTB	Psalm 25:1	EECM 11/34CPDL
O Lord, in thee is all my Trust	SAATB	From The Whole Booke of Psalmes (Note: A compilation of Psalms by Thomas Sternold and John Hopkins. The author of this Full Anthem's words is anonymous.)	EECM 21/7 CPDL
O Lord, in thy wrath	SSAATB	Psalm vi.1–4	EECM 21/8CPDL

===== Doubtful Attributions =====
Doubtful Attributions
Title	Voices	Author	Reference
Out of the deep	SSAATB	William Byrd	W. Byrd O. Gibbons (Note: EECM 21/9)
O Lord, increase my faith	SATB	Henry Loosemore	H Loosemore O GibbonsCPDL
Why art thou so heavy, O my soul?	SATB	Henry Loosemore	H Loosemore O GibbonsCPDL

==== Verse Anthems ====
* Incomplete or lost work

Verse Anthems
Title	Voices	Verse Solo(s)	Instruments	Text	Occasion	Reference
Almighty God, which hast given*	SAATB		-	Second Communion Collect	Christmas Day	EECM 21/1
Almighty God, who by thy Son	SAATB		Organ version survives (Note: Probably once had a viol consort accompaniment version.)	Collect for St Peter's Day	St. Peter's Day	EECM 3/1 CPDL
Behold, I bring you glad tidings	SSAATB		Organ version survives	Luke ii. 10–11, 14	Christmas Day	EECM 3/2 CPDL
Behold, thou hast made my days	SAATB		Viol consort and Organ version survive	Psalm xxxix. 6–8, 13–15 (Note: By the Bishops' Bible verse numbers, authorized version is 5–7, 12–13.)	Funeral of Dean Maxey	EECM 21/3 CPDL
Blessed are all they that fear the Lord	AATTBB		Viol consort and Organ version survive	Psalm cxxviii. 1–4	Lord Somerset's wedding	EECM 3/4 CPDL
Glorious and powerful God	SAATB		Viol consort and Organ version survive	-	For the consecration of an unknown church or chapel (Note: Possibly for festivities for Whitsunday instead.)	EECM 3/5 CPDL
Grant, O Holy Trinity (Note: Written in 1625; likely the last Verse Anthem Gibbons composed.)	SAATB		Partial Organ version survives.	The Royal Chapel word-books (Note: Specifically from Bodleian Library MS Rawlinson Poet. 23 and BL MS Additional 6346.)	King's day (Note: Perhaps written for the accession of King Charles I)	EECM 3/6 CPDL
Great King of Gods (Note: Performed and written in 1617)	SAATB	AAB	Viol consort and Organ version survive	Jehovah of Psalm 95	King James I 1617 visit to Scotland	EECM 3/7 CPDL
If ye be risen again with Christ	SSATB		Organ version survives	Colossians iii. 1–4	Easter Day	EECM 3/8 CPDL
Lord, grant grace	SAATB	SSAATTBB	Viol consort and Organ version survive	-	All Saints' Day	EECM 3/9 CPDL
Lord, we beseech thee*	SAATB		-	-	The Annunciation of Virgin Mary	EECM 21/2
O all true faithful hearts	SAATB	SSAATB	Viol consort and Organ version survive	-	Thanksgiving for the King's recovery	EECM 3/11 CPDL
O glorious God*	Only text survives		-	-	-	EECM 21/8
O God, the King of glory	SAATB	SAAT	Organ version survives	Book of Common Prayer	The Sunday after Ascension Day	EECM 3/10 CPDL
Praise the Lord, O my soul* (Note: Authenticity has been questioned.)	SSSAATB		-	-	-	EECM 21/3
See, see the Word is incarnate	SSAATB	SCCTB	Viol consort and Organ version survive	Words by Godfrey Goodman	-	EECM 3/12 CPDL
Sing unto the Lord	SAATB	BB, AA & AB	Viol consort and Organ version survive	Psalm xxx. 4–10	For Doctor Marshal	EECM 3/13 CPDL
So God loved the world*	SSATB		-	-	Whitsunday	EECM 21/4
Teach us by his example*	Only text survives		-	-	-	EECM 21/7
This is the day*	Only text survives		-	-	-	EECM 21/9
This is the Record of John	SAATB		Viol consort and Organ version survive	John i. 19–23.	St. John's Baptist's Day	EECM 3/15 CPDL
Thou God of wisdom*	SSAATB		-	-	-	EECM 21/5
Unto thee, O Lord* (Note: Authenticity has been questioned.)	SSAATB		-	-	-	EECM 21/6
We praise Thee, O Father	SAATB	SAB & SSAATT	Viol consort and Organ version survive	Proper preface for Easter Day	Easter Day	EECM 3/16 CPDL

===== Adaptations =====
Various adaptations of Gibbons' Verse Anthems exist, two of which – O Thou the central orb and Great Lord of Lords – are especially common. Both of these versions were created for Sir Frederick Ouseley's 1873 edition of Gibbons' church music, with new words by Henry Ramsden Bramley.

Adaptations
Title	Voices	Verse Solo(s)	Instruments	Text	Occasion	Reference
O Thou the central orb	SAATB	SSAATB	Viol consort and Organ version survive	Bramley	For 1873 publication	EECM 3/7 CPDL
Great Lord of Lords	SAATB	AAB	Viol consort and Organ version survive	Bramley	For 1873 publication	EECM 3/7 CPDL

===== Doubtful Attributions =====
Doubtful Attributions
Title	Author	Reference
Arise, O Lord God	By Leonard Woodeson	EECM L Woodeson EECM O Gibbons
Behold, the hour cometh	By Thomas Tomkins	T Tomkins EECM O Gibbons
God, which [who] as at this time	By Nathaniel Giles	N Giles O Gibbons
Have mercy upon me, O God	By William Byrd	W Byrd O Gibbons CPDL
Have pity upon me	By Christopher Gibbons	EECM C Gibbons EECM O Gibbons
The secret sins	Probably by William Mundy (Note: Not widely accepted.)	EECM 3/14 CPDL

==== Hymne tunes ====
George Withers' 'Hymnes and Songs of the Church', published 1623, contains 16 works by Gibbons in the original edition and adds a 17th in a later edition. All texts are by George Wither.

17 tunes for The Hymnes and Songs of the Church
No.	Title	Reference
1	Now Shall the praises of the Lord be sung	
3	Sing praises, Israel, to the Lord	
4	Now in the Lord my heart doth pleasure	
5	Thy beauty, Israel, is gone	
9	Come kiss me with those lips	
13	O my love, how comely	
14	Arise, thou north wind	
18	Who's this, that leaning on her friend	
20	Lord, I will sing to thee	
22	O Lord of hosts	
24	How sad and solitary	
31	Lord, thy answer I did hear	
34	Thus angels sung	
41	O all you creatures	
44	Come Holy Ghost	CPDL
46	As on the night before this blessed morn	CPDL
47	A song of joy unto the Lord	
67	When one among the twelve there was	

=== Secular Vocal works ===
==== The First Set of Madrigals and Motets ====
The First Set of Madrigals and Motets
No.	Title	Voices	Reference
1	The silver swan	SATTB	CPDL
2	O that the learned poets	SSTTB	CPDL
3	I weigh not fortune's frown	SSATB	CPDL
4	I tremble not at noise of war	SSATB	CPDL
5	I see ambition never pleased	SSATB	CPDL
6	I feign not friendship	SSATB	CPDL
7	How art thou thralled	SSTTB	CPDL
8	Farewell all joys	SSTTB	CPDL
9	Dainty fine bird	SSTTB	CPDL
10	Fair ladies that to love captivated are	SSATB	CPDL
11	'Mongst thousands good	SSATB	CPDL
12	Now each flowery bank	SATTB	CPDL
13	Lais now old	SATTB	CPDL
14	What is our life?	SAATB	CPDL
15	Ah dear heart	SATTB	CPDL
16	Fair is the rose	SSATB (Note: Or SATTB.)	CPDL
17	Nay let me weep	SATTB	CPDL
18	Ne'er let the sun	SATTB	CPDL
19	Yet if that age	SATTB	CPDL
20	Trust not too much	SSTTB	CPDL

==== Consort songs ====
Consort songs
Title	Voices	Instruments	Text	Occasion	Reference
Do not repine, fair sun	ATB Soli/SAATB	Viol Consort	Words attributed to Joseph Hall	King James I 1617 visit to Scotland	
The cries of London	SATTB	Viol Consort			IMSLPCPDL

=== Keyboard works ===
==== Parthenia ====
Parthenia
No.	Title	Reference
16	Galliard	MB 20/25
17	Fantasia of four parts	MB 20/12
18	The Lord of Salisbury his pavan	MB 20/18
19	Galliard [to the pavan]	MB 20/19
20	The Queen's command	MB 20/28
21	Prelude	MB 20/2

==== Fantasies ====
Keyboard Fantasies
Title	Reference
Fantasy in C	MB 20/13
Fantasy in C	MB 20/14
Fantasy in C	MB 20/49
Fantasy in d	MB 20/6
Fantasy in d (Note: (for a double organ))	MB 20/7
Fantasy in d minor	MB 20/8
Fantasy in g minor	MB 20/9
Fantasy in a	MB 20/10
Fantasy in a	MB 20/11

==== Pavans and Galliards ====
Keyboard Pavans and Galliards
Title	Reference
Pavan in d	MB 20/15
Pavan in g minor (Note: List as "two flats")	MB 20/16
Pavan in a (Note: Previously mistitled as a "Fantasia.")	MB 20/17
Galliard in d	MB 20/21
Galliard in d	MB 20/22
Galliard in d	MB 20/23
Galliard in d (Lady Hatton)	MB 20/20
Galliard in a (Note: Previously incorrectly attributed to Thomas Tomkins)	MB 20/24

==== Other pieces ====
Other keyboard pieces
Title	Reference
French air	MB 20/32
Almain in C	MB 20/35
Almain in d	MB 20/33
Almain in d (French) (Note: Some sources refer to it as "a mask" or "Nan's mask.")	MB 20/41
Almain in G (The King's Jewel)	MB 20/36
Almain in G	MB 20/37
Almain in a (Note: Some sources refer to it as "a mask.")	MB 20/34
Coranto in d (French)	MB 20/38
Coranto in d minor (Note: Some sources refer to it as "a mask.")	MB 20/39
Coranto in a (Note: Some sources refer to it as "a toy.")	MB 20/40
The fairest nymph (Note: Some sources refer to it as a "Gray's Inn mask.")	MB 20/43
Ground in C (Italian) (Note: Some sources refer to it as an "Almain.")	MB 20/27
Ground in a	MB 20/26
The hunt's up (Peascod time)	MB 20/30
Lincoln's Inn mask (Note: Sometimes known as "Tap up all your strong beer" and "The Prince's mask.")	MB 20/44
A mask (Note: Sometimes known as "The Temple Mask.")	MB 20/45
Prelude in a (Note: Some sources refer to it as a "Fantasia" or "A running fantasia.")	MB 20/1
Prelude in d minor (Note: Some sources refer to it as a "Fantasia.")	MB 20/5

=== Instrumental works ===
==== Viol fantasias of two parts ====
Fantasia à2, VdGS No.3 for 2 Treble Viols by Orlando Gibbons
Recorded by Phillip W. Serna in August 2019

Fantasia à2, VdGS No.4 for 2 Treble Viols by Orlando Gibbons
Recorded by Phillip W. Serna in August 2019

Title	Reference
Fantasia in F, a 2	MB 48/1
Fantasia in F, a 2	MB 48/2
Fantasia in C, a 2	MB 48/3
Fantasia in d, a 2	MB 48/4
Fantasia in G, a 2	MB 48/5
Fantasia in d minor, a 2	MB 48/6

==== Fantasies of Three Parts ====
Fantasia à3, No.3 for Treble & Bass Viols with Great Bass by Orlando Gibbons
Recorded by Phillip W. Serna in July 2019

Galliard à3 for Treble & Bass Viols with Great Bass by Orlando Gibbons
Recorded by Phillip W. Serna in July 2019

Fantasies of Three Parts dedicated to Edward Wraye.

Fantasies of Three Parts
No	Title	Reference
1	Fantasia in g minor	MB 48/7
2	Fantasia in g minor	MB 48/8
3	Fantasia in g minor	MB 48/9
4	Fantasia in d	MB 48/10
5	Fantasia in d	MB 48/11
6	Fantasia in d	MB 48/12
7	Fantasia in d	MB 48/13
8	Fantasia in d	MB 48/14
9	Fantasia in d	MB 48/15

==== Viol fantasias with double bass ====
Fantasia à4, No.1 for Treble, Tenor & Bass Viols with Great Bass by Orlando Gibbons
Recorded by Phillip W. Serna in July 2019

Title	Parts	Reference
Fantasia in g minor	a 3	MB 48/16
Fantasia in g minor	a 3	MB 48/17
Fantasia in d	a 3	MB 48/18
Fantasia in d	a 3	MB 48/19
Fantasia in C	a 4	MB 48/24
Fantasia in C	a 4	MB 48/25

==== Viol In Nomines ====
Title	Parts	Reference
Nomine in d minor	a 4	MB 48/26
Nomine in d minor	a 5	MB 48/27
Nomine in g minor	a 5	MB 48/28
Nomine in g minor	a 5	MB 48/29

==== Viol fantasias of six parts ====
* Incomplete or lost work

Title	Reference
Fantasia in g minor, a 6	MB 48/31
Fantasia in g minor, a 6	MB 48/32
Fantasia in d, a 6	MB 48/33
Fantasia in d, a 6	MB 48/34
Fantasia in a, a 6	MB 48/35
Fantasia in a, a 6	MB 48/36
Fantasia in g minor, (Note: List as "two flats") a 6	MB 48/37
Fantasia in g minor, a 6	MB 48/38
Fantasia in g minor, a 6	MB 48/39

==== Other pieces for viols ====
Title	Parts	Reference
Galliard in G	a 6	MB 48/42
Pavan (De le roye) in a and e	a 5?	MB 48/30
Pavan in G	a 6	MB 48/41
Go from my window	a 6	MB 48/40
