= The Oxford Book of Tudor Anthems =

1978 music book edited by Christopher Morris

The Oxford Book of Tudor Anthems: 34 Anthems for Mixed Voices
- Editor: Christopher Morris
- Cover artist: William Camden
- Language: Early Modern English, Latin
- Subject: Christian music (sheet music)
- Publisher: Oxford University Press
- Publication date: 1978
- Publication place: United Kingdom
- Media type: Print (paperback)
- Pages: 360
- ISBN: 978-0193533257
- Website: The Oxford Book of Tudor Anthems on OUP.com

The Oxford Book of Tudor Anthems is a collection of vocal scores of music from the Tudor era of England (c.1550-1625). It was published in 1978 by Oxford University Press and was compiled by the organist and publisher Christopher Morris (1922-2014), the editor of OUP who also was involved with the popular Carols for Choirs series of books in the 1970s. The preface was written by Sir David Willcocks.

Oxford University Press had previously published a 10-volume anthology Tudor Church Music edited by Sir Percy Buck.

== Recording ==
A recording was issued in 1979, Tudor Anthems (OUP 153), featuring 13 anthems from the Oxford Book of Tudor Anthems sung by the Choir of Christ Church Cathedral, Oxford and conducted by Simon Preston.

== Contents ==
The collection encompasses 34 motets and anthems by 14 different composers who were active during the Tudor period, sometimes referred as "the Golden Age of English church music", which spans from around 1500 to the end of the reign of King James VI and I in 1625. This period in English history was especially marked by the religious upheaval of the English Reformation, which was advanced by King Edward VI. With competing demands over the language of Church of England liturgy, composers of this era variously set both Latin and English texts to music, and this is reflected in the range of works presented in this book. The later anthems in English take their texts from the King James Bible which was commissioned in 1604, but words from earlier Bible translations such as the 1526 Tyndale Bible and from prayer books such as the 1549 Book of Common Prayer are also included. A variety of musical styles is represented in the collection, from simple four-part harmony to more elaborate polyphonic motets for up to eight voices, including both a cappella pieces and anthems requiring instrumental accompaniment.

Sources for this collection include a set of partbooks from the British Library, copied by Thomas Myriell and entitled Trisitiae Remedium (1616), and partbooks sourced from the libraries of Christ Church, Oxford (c.1620) and St Michael's College, Tenbury (c.1615).

Number	Composer	Anthem
1	Thomas Weelkes	Alleluia. I heard a voice
2	Orlando Gibbons	Almighty and everlasting God
3	Peter Philips	Ascendit Deus
4	Robert Parsons	Ave Maria
5	William Byrd	Ave verum corpus
6	Richard Farrant	Call to remembrance
7	Richard Dering	Factum est silentium
8	Christopher Tye	Give almes of thy goods
9	Thomas Weelkes	Gloria in excelsis Deo
10	William Byrd	Haec dies
11	Richard Farrant	Hide not thou thy face
12	Orlando Gibbons	Hosanna to the Son of David
13	Thomas Weelkes	Hosanna to the Son of David
14	Thomas Tomkins	I heard a voice
15	Thomas Tallis	If ye love me
16	William Byrd	Justorum animae
17	William Byrd	Laetentur coeli
18	Thomas Mudd	Let thy merciful ears
19	Richard Farrant or John Hilton	Lord, for thy tender mercy's sake
20	William Byrd	Miserere mei
21	Orlando Gibbons	O clap your hands after Psalm 47
22	Thomas Weelkes	O Lord, arise
23	Orlando Gibbons	O Lord, in thy wrath
24	William Mundy	O Lord, the maker
25	Thomas Tallis	O nata lux
26	Adrian Batten	O praise the Lord
27	William Byrd	O quam gloriosum
28	Thomas Tallis	Salvator mundi
29	William Byrd	Sing joyfully
30	William Byrd	Teach me, O Lord
31	William Byrd	This day Christ was born
32	Orlando Gibbons	This is the Record of John
33	Thomas Tomkins	When David heard
34	Thomas Weelkes	When David heard

== See also ==
- List of Anglican church composers
- List of Renaissance composers
- Drexel 4180–4185
- Oxford Book of English Madrigals
