= The Oxford Book of English Madrigals =

- Editor: Philip Ledger
- Cover artist: Jan Brueghel the Elder & Peter Paul Rubens
- Language: English
- Subject: Sheet Music - Folk & Traditional
- Publisher: Oxford University Press
- Publication date: 1978
- Publication place: United Kingdom
- Media type: Print (paperback)
- Pages: 403
- ISBN: 978-0-19-343664-0
- Website: OUP.com

The Oxford Book of English Madrigals was edited by Philip Ledger, and published in 1978 by the Oxford University Press. It contains words and full music for some 60 of the madrigals and songs of the English Madrigal School.

When selecting works for this book, Ledger decided to represent the major composers of 16th-century English music such as William Byrd and Thomas Morley with several madrigals, alongside individual works by lesser-known composers. Ledger collaborated with Andrew Parker, a musicologist from King's College, Cambridge, who researched texts to the songs and supplemented the collection with annotations and critical commentary.

In 1978, the choral group Pro Cantione Antiqua released a recording, directed by Ledger, of selected songs from this book.

== Contents ==
The collection contains the following madrigals:

Composer	Madrigal
Thomas Bateson	Those sweet delightful lilies
John Bennet	All creatures now
John Bennet	Weep, O mine eyes
William Byrd	Lullaby, my sweet little baby
William Byrd	This sweet and merry month of May
William Byrd	Though Amaryllis dance
Michael Cavendish	Come, gentle swains
Michael East	Poor is the life
Michael East	Quick, quick, away, dispatch!
Michael East	(*No haste, but good!)
John Farmer	Fair nymphs, I heard one telling
John Farmer	Fair Phyllis I saw
Giles Farnaby	Consture my meaning
Orlando Gibbons	Ah, dear heart
Orlando Gibbons	Dainty fine bird
Orlando Gibbons	Oh that the learned poets
Orlando Gibbons	The Silver Swan
Orlando Gibbons	Trust not too much, fair youth
Orlando Gibbons	What is our life?
Thomas Greaves	Come away sweet love
George Kirbye	See what a maze of error
Thomas Morley	April is in my mistress' face
Thomas Morley	Fyer, fyer!
Thomas Morley	Hard by a crystal fountain
Thomas Morley	I love, alas, I love thee
Thomas Morley	Leave, alas, this tormenting
Thomas Morley	My bonny lass she smileth
Thomas Morley	Now is the month of maying
Thomas Morley	Sing we and chant it
Thomas Morley	Though Philomela lost her love
Thomas Morley	Whither away so fast
Robert Ramsey	Sleep, fleshly birth
Thomas Tomkins	Adieu, ye city-prisoning towers
Thomas Tomkins	Music divine
Thomas Tomkins	Oh yes, has any found a lad?
Thomas Tomkins	See, see the shepherds' queen
Thomas Tomkins	Too much I once lamented
Thomas Vautor	Mother, I will have a husband
Thomas Vautor	Sweet Suffolk owl
John Ward	Come sable night
John Ward	Out from the vale
Thomas Weelkes	As Vesta was
Thomas Weelkes	Come, sirrah Jack, ho!
Thomas Weelkes	Hark, all ye lovely saints
Thomas Weelkes	O care, thou wilt despatch me
Thomas Weelkes	(*Hence care, thou art too cruel)
Thomas Weelkes	Since Robin Hood
Thomas Weelkes	Sing we at pleasure
Thomas Weelkes	Strike it up, tabor
Thomas Weelkes	Thule, the period of cosmography
Thomas Weelkes	(*The Andalusian merchant)
Thomas Weelkes	Thus sings my dearest jewel
John Wilbye	Adieu, sweet Amaryllis
John Wilbye	Draw on, sweet night
John Wilbye	Flora gave me fairest flowers
John Wilbye	Lady, when I behold
John Wilbye	O what shall I do
John Wilbye	Sweet honey-sucking bees
John Wilbye	(*Yet, sweet, take heed)
John Wilbye	Weep, weep, mine eyes

(*) = second parts

== See also ==
- Early music of the British Isles
- The Triumphs of Oriana Morley's famous collection of 1601
