= Swan song =

Final gesture or effort

A 1664 engraving by Reinier van Persijn in Willem de Swaen's The Singing Swan

The phrase "swan song" (Ancient Greek: κύκνειον ᾆσμα kýkneion ásma; Latin: carmen cygni) refers to a final gesture, effort, or performance given just before death or retirement. It is metaphorical and refers to an ancient belief that swans sing a beautiful song just before their death while they have been silent (or alternatively not so musical) for most of their lifetime.

The belief, whose basis has been long debated, had become proverbial in ancient Greece by the 3rd century BCE and was reiterated many times in later Western poetry and art. In reality, swans learn a variety of sounds throughout their lifetime; their sounds are more distinguishable during courting rituals, and are not typically correlated with time of death (although see "Ornithological accuracy" below).

== Origin and description ==
In Greek mythology, the swan was a bird consecrated to Apollo, and it was therefore considered a symbol of harmony and beauty and its limited capabilities as a singer were sublimated to those of songbirds.

Aesop's fable of "The Swan and the Goose" incorporates the swan song legend as saving its life when it was caught by mistake instead of the goose but was recognized by its song. There is a subsequent reference in Aeschylus' Agamemnon from 458 BC. In that play, Clytemnestra compares the dead Cassandra to a swan who has "sung her last lament".

In Plato's Phaedo, the character of Socrates says that, although swans sing in early life, they do not do so as beautifully as before they die. He adds that there is a popular belief that the swans' song is sorrowful, but Socrates prefers to think that they sing for joy, having "foreknowledge of the blessings in the other world". Aristotle noted in his History of Animals that swans "are musical, and sing chiefly at the approach of death". By the third century BC the belief had become a proverb.

Ovid mentions the legend in "The Story of Picus and Canens":

In tears she poured out words with a faint voice,
lamenting her sad woe, as when the swan
about to die sings a funereal dirge.

It is also possible that the swan song has some connection to the lament of Cycnus of Liguria at the death of his lover, Phaethon, the ambitious and headstrong son of Helios and Clymene. The name Cycnus is the Latinised form of the Greek, which means "swan". Hyginus proposes in his Fabulae that the mournful Cycnus, who is transformed into a swan by the gods, joins the dirge of the amber-crying poplars, the Heliades, the half-sisters of the dead Phaethon, who also experienced a metamorphosis at the death of the reckless Phaethon.

== Ornithological accuracy ==
The most familiar European swan, the mute swan (Cygnus olor), although not actually mute, is known neither for musicality nor to vocalize as it dies. This has led some to criticize swan song beliefs since antiquity, one of the earliest being Pliny the Elder: in CE 77, Natural History (book 10, chapter xxxii: olorum morte narratur flebilis cantus, falso, ut arbitror, aliquot experimentis), states: "observation shows that the story that the dying swan sings is false." Peterson et al. note that Cygnus olor is "not mute but lacks bugling call, merely honking, grunting, and hissing on occasion."

However, the whooper swan (Cygnus cygnus), a winter visitor to parts of the eastern Mediterranean, possesses a 'bugling' call, and has been noted for issuing a drawn-out series of notes as its lungs collapse upon expiry, both being a consequence of an additional tracheal loop within its sternum. This was proposed by naturalist Peter Pallas as the basis for the legend. Both mute and whooper swans appear to be represented in ancient Greek and Egyptian art.

The whooper swan's nearest relatives, the trumpeter and tundra swans, share its musical tracheal loop. Zoologist D.G. Elliot reported in 1898 that a tundra swan he had shot and wounded in flight began a long glide down whilst issuing a series of "plaintive and musical" notes that "sounded at times like the soft running of the notes of an octave".

== Later cultural references ==
The notion that swans sing a final song before dying continued to influence Western culture into the early modern era. For instance, Chaucer's Parlement of Foules contains a reference to "the Ialous swan, ayens his deth that singeth [the jealous swan, that sings at his death]". Leonardo da Vinci also mentioned the legend in his notebooks: "The swan is white without spot, and it sings sweetly as it dies, that song ending its life."

In Shakespeare's The Merchant of Venice, Portia exclaims "Let music sound while he doth make his choice; / Then, if he lose, he makes a swan-like end, / Fading in music." Similarly, in Othello, the dying Emilia exclaims, "I will play the swan, / And die in music."

A well-known madrigal by Orlando Gibbons, "The Silver Swan", states the legend thus:

The silver Swan, who living had no Note,
when Death approached, unlocked her silent throat.
Leaning her breast against the reedy shore,
thus sang her first and last, and sang no more:
"Farewell, all joys! O Death, come close mine eyes!
"More Geese than Swans now live, more Fools than Wise."

Other poets who have taken inspiration from the legend include Alfred, Lord Tennyson, whose poem "The Dying Swan" is a poetic evocation of the "wild swan's death-hymn"; Thomas Sturge Moore's poem of the same name; and Samuel Taylor Coleridge, who quipped: "Swans sing before they die— 't were no bad thing / Should certain persons die before they sing."

=== Idiomatic usage ===
The phrase "swan song" has also taken on a metaphorical sense, referring to the final work of a creative artist, especially when produced shortly before death, or more generally to any final performance or accomplishment. For example, Schwanengesang (Swan Song) is the title of a posthumously published collection of songs by Franz Schubert, written at the end of his life. It is the title usually given to Heinrich Schuetz' Opus 13 from 1671, the year before he died. The term is often applied in a similar way to the works of modern musicians, such as David Bowie's Blackstar, Johnny Cash's rendition of "Hurt", J Dilla's Donuts, Queen's "Innuendo" and Nirvana's rendition of "Where Did You Sleep Last Night?".

A dramatic or notable achievement by an athlete just prior to their retirement, such as baseball player Derek Jeter's walk-off hit in his final game at Yankee Stadium, might also be referred to as their "swan song". An example, in the film industry, is represented by "The Last Movie Star", Rolling Stone referred to the film as Burt Reynolds's "swan song". The film was one of Reynolds's last film projects, and he died several months after the film's release.

== See also ==
- Death poem
