= List of Anglican church composers =

Composers who have made significant contributions to the repertory of Anglican church music.

== A ==
- Malcolm Archer
- Thomas Armstrong
- Thomas Attwood
- Richard Ayleward
- Raffaella Aleotti

== B ==
- Edgar Bainton
- Edward Bairstow
- John Barnard
- Joseph Barnby
- Adrian Batten
- Jonathan Battishill
- Lennox Berkeley
- William Thomas Best
- Elway Bevin
- Hugh Blair
- John Blow
- William Boyce
- Harry Bramma
- David Briggs
- Kerensa Briggs
- Benjamin Britten
- Albertus Bryne
- William Byrd
- Judith Bingham
- Amy Beach
- Diana Burrell
- Sally Beamish
- Carol Barnett

== C ==
- Anthony Caesar
- Jeremiah Clarke
- Rebecca Clarke
- Benjamin Cooke
- Henry Cooke
- Robert Cooke
- Joseph Corfe
- Avril Coleridge-Taylor
- Robert Creighton
- William Croft
- William Crotch
- Jean Coulthard

== D ==
- Harold Darke
- John Albert Delany
- Richard Dering
- James Douglas
- Jonathan Dove
- Thomas Sanders Dupuis
- George Dyson
- Eleanor Daley

== F ==
- Richard Farrant
- Gerald Finzi
- Cheryl Frances-Hoad

== G ==
- Henry Gadsby
- Bernard Gates
- Orlando Gibbons
- John Goss
- Maurice Greene

== H ==
- Peter Hallock
- Calvin Hampton
- George Frideric Handel
- William H. Harris
- Basil Harwood
- William Henry Havergal
- Philip Hayes
- William Hayes
- Edward John Hopkins
- Martin How
- Herbert Howells
- Pelham Humfrey
- Peter Hurford
- Imogen Holst

== I ==
- John Ireland
- Grayston Ives

== J ==
- Enderby Jackson
- Francis Jackson
- William Jackson of Exeter
- William Jackson of Masham
- Roger Jones
- John Joubert

== K ==
- James Kent
- Charles King
- Gerald Knight

== L ==
- Craig Sellar Lang
- Kenneth Leighton

== M ==
- John Merbecke
- George William Martin
- William Mathias
- J. H. Maunder
- E. J. Moeran
- Thomas Morley
- Herbert Murrill
- Cecilia McDowall
- Sarah MacDonald (musician)
- Elizabeth Maconchy

== N ==
- Peter Nardone
- James Nares
- Sydney Nicholson
- T. Tertius Noble
- June Nixon

== O ==
- George Oldroyd
- Frederick Ouseley

== P ==
- Frederick Augustus Packer
- Hubert Parry
- Osbert Parsley
- Robert Parsons
- Walter Porter
- Francis Pott
- Daniel Purcell
- Henry Purcell
- Florence Price
- Roxanna Panufnik
- Elizabeth Poston

== R ==
- Vaughan Richardson
- Alan Ridout
- Sir John Rogers, 6th Baronet
- Barry Rose
- Bernard Rose
- John Rutter

== S ==
- John Sanders
- Martin Shaw
- Richard Shephard
- John Sheppard
- Caleb Simper
- Henry Smart
- William Smith
- Leo Sowerby
- John Stainer
- Charles Villiers Stanford
- Charles Steggall
- Charles Edward Stephens
- Charles Hylton Stewart
- Herbert Sumsion
- Undine Smith Moore
- Rhian Samuel

== T ==
- Thomas Tallis
- John Tavener
- John Taverner
- Thomas Tomkins
- George William Torrance
- John Travers
- Noël Tredinnick
- James Turle
- William Turner
- Christopher Tye

== V ==
- Stanley Vann
- Ralph Vaughan Williams
- Charles Garland Verrinder

== W ==
- Thomas Attwood Walmisley
- William Walton
- Thomas Weelkes
- John Weldon
- Samuel Wesley
- Samuel Sebastian Wesley
- Alfred Wheeler
- Healey Willan
- Michael Wise
- Charles Wood
- Richard Woodward
- Judith Weir
- Errollyn Wallen
- Grace Williams
- Janet Wheeler

== See also ==
- List of Anglicans and Episcopalians
