= Robert Parsons (composer) =

English composer (c. 1535 – 1572)

- Born: c. 1535
- Died: 25 January 1572 (aged c. 37); Newark-on-Trent, Nottinghamshire
- Occupation: Composer
- Known for: Anglican church music
- Notable work: The First Service, Ave Maria, In manus tuas

Robert Parsons (c. 1535 – 25 January 1572) was an English composer of the Tudor period who was active during the reigns of King Edward VI, Queen Mary I, and Queen Elizabeth I. He is noted for his compositions of church music.

== Early life ==
Parsons was born around 1530–35, but no details of his birth survive and there is no evidence connecting him with either Robert Parsons (1596–1676), a vicar choral at Exeter Cathedral, or his contemporary, the composer William Parsons of Wells. Although little is known about his life, it is likely that in his youth he was a choir boy, as until 1561 he was an assistant to Richard Bower, Master of the Children of the Chapel Royal.

== Career and influence ==
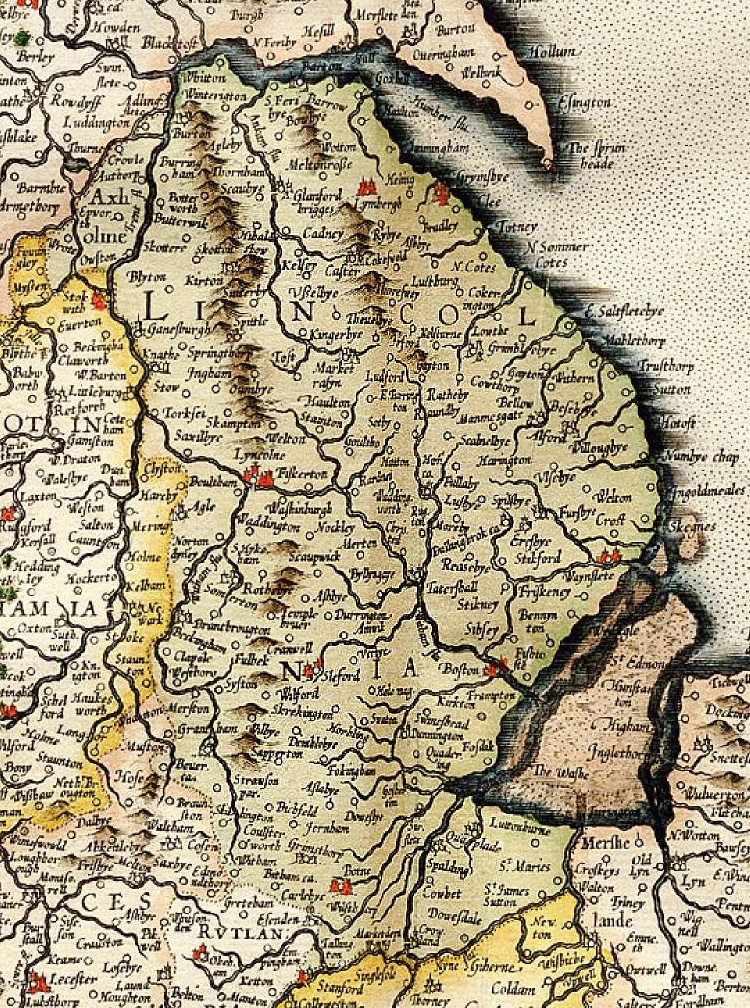
1596 map of Lincolnshire, where both Parsons and Byrd lived and worked (Mercator)

Parsons was composing during a period of major religious upheaval in England. After the death of Henry VIII in 1547, the new king, Edward VI, advanced the Reformation in England, introducing major changes to the liturgy of the Church of England. In 1549, Thomas Cranmer's new Book of Common Prayer swept away the old Latin-language liturgy and replaced it with prayers in English. This brand new liturgy suddenly demanded that new music be written in English for the church, and musicians of the Chapel Royal such as Thomas Tallis, John Sheppard, and Parsons were called upon to demonstrate that the new Protestantism was no less splendid than the old Catholic religion.

During the reign of Mary Tudor (1553–1558), a revival of Catholic practice encouraged a return to Latin music, but after Elizabeth I ascended to the throne of England in 1558, vernacular English liturgy and music came back into favour.

Parsons was appointed Gentleman of the Chapel Royal on 17 October 1563. His work consisted of a number of sacred and secular vocal compositions. His earliest known composition is his First Service, a setting of text from the 1549 Prayer Book of King Edward VI and his largest surviving work. Its existence suggests that Parsons was actively composing from at least the early 1550s. This work contained settings of the canticles for the new services of Morning (Venite, Te Deum, Benedictus) and Evening Prayer (Magnificat and Nunc Dimittis), as well as a setting of the Credo and short Responses to the Ten Commandments for the Holy Communion service.

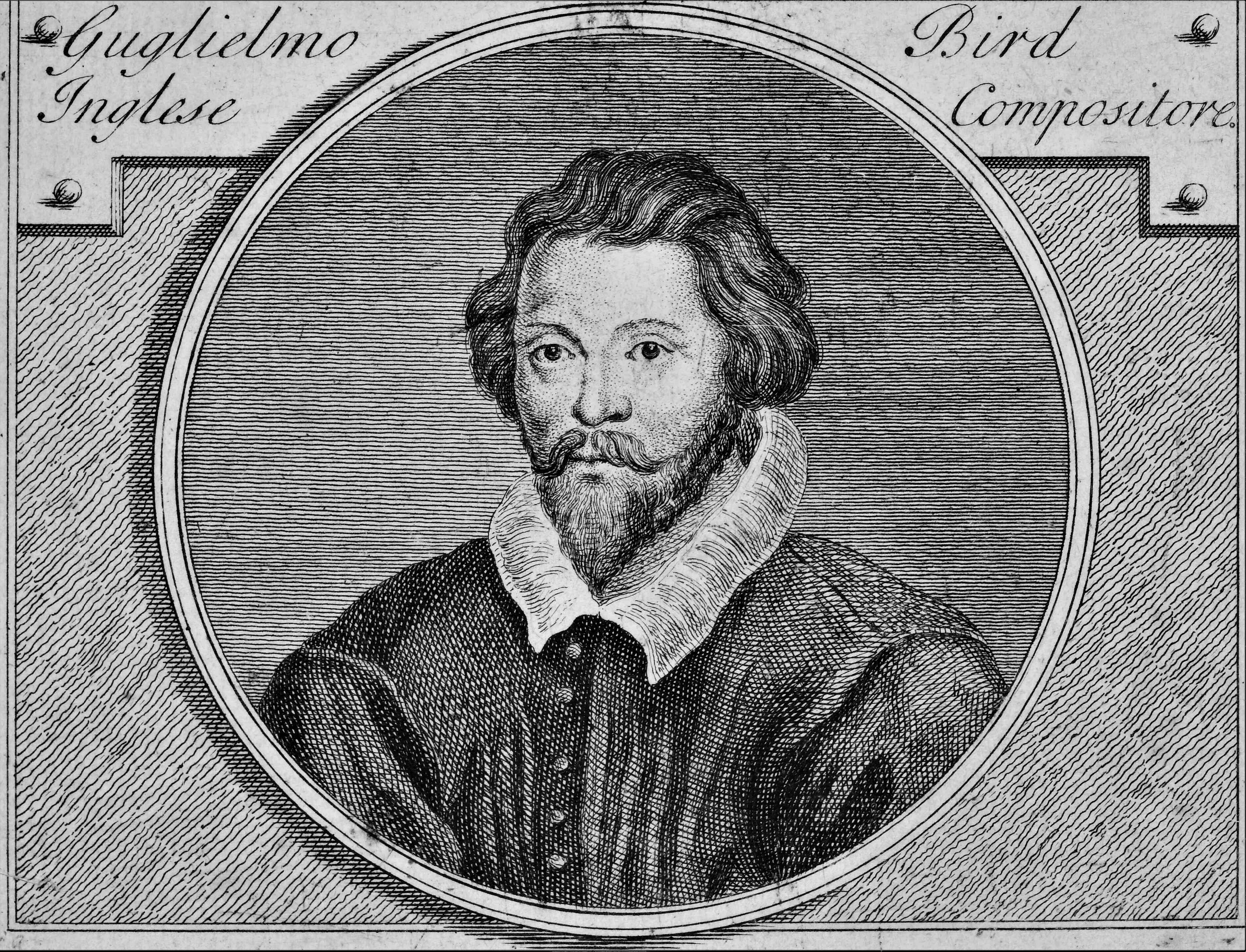
William Byrd (1543–1623), who was influenced by Parsons

Parsons is especially noted for his choral motets, and he is recognised as a master of polyphonic writing for choirs with the skilled use of cantus firmus within his works. Notable works include his setting of Ave Maria, the anthem Deliver me from mine enemies, and some instrumental pieces. Eight of these works were included in the music manuscript known as the Dow Partbooks, and several of his vocal works also feature in the Drexel and Peterhouse partbooks. Parsons was the first English composer to write a setting of the Office for the Dead, and he was possibly influenced by the work of Alfonso Ferrabosco, an Italian composer who was active in England at the time.

Parsons worked with other composers of his day and it is thought that he collaborated with Richard Farrant on dramatic productions during the early 1560s. Similarities have been demonstrated between John Sheppard's 1558 Second Service and Parsons's First Service, suggesting that Parsons was greatly influenced by Sheppard's compositional style. Parsons is also closely connected with the composer William Byrd. Parsons's influences can be traced in Byrd's instrumental works and choral motets. The two musicians lived and worked in the county of Lincolnshire; in 1567, Parsons was granted a Crown lease on a rectory at Stainton in Lincolnshire, 4 miles (6.4 km) from Hainton, where Byrd resided, and it is thought that Parsons may have taught Byrd at Lincoln Cathedral.

== Works ==
In Nomine à7, No.2, London. GB-Lbl, Add.Ms.31390 (ca.1578)

Ut re mi fa sol la à4 from the Hamond Partbooks, London. GB-Lbl, Add.Ms.30480-4 (ca.1560-90)
Performed by Phillip W. Serna, Treble, Tenor & Bass Viols

=== English works ===
- The First Service (also known as The Great Service)
- The Second 'Excellent' Service for Means
  (evening canticles to the Second Service composed by William Mundy in tribute to Parsons)

English anthems

- Deliver me from mine enemies
- Holy Lord God Almighty

Consort songs

- Abradad: Alas you salt sea gods
- Enforced by Love and Fear
- No grief is like to mine
- Pour down you powers divine

=== Latin works ===
- Ave Maria
- Credo quod redemptor meus vivit
- Domine, quis habitabit
- Iam Christus astra ascenderat
- In manus tuas
- Retribue servo tuo
- Libera me, Domine, de morte aeterna
- Magnificat
- O bone Jesu
- Peccantem me quotidie

== Death and legacy ==
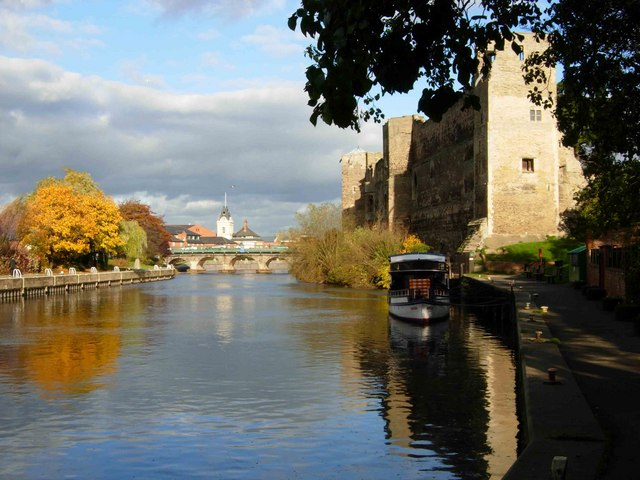
The River Trent at Newark

Parsons is believed to have died in January 1571/2, when he fell into the then swollen River Trent at Newark-on-Trent in Nottinghamshire and drowned. His sudden death was marked with great sadness as he had gained considerable acclaim as a composer. The eulogy at his funeral (published in the Dow Partbook) lamented the fact that his life had been cut short at a young age:

Qui tantus primo Parsone in flore fuisti, quantus in autumno in morerer flores
("You who were so great, Parsons, in life's springtime, how great you would have been in autumn, had death not intervened")

There is no record of Parsons's body ever having been retrieved from the river following his death. His son, John Parsons (1563–1623), was a minor composer who served as organist of Westminster Abbey (1621–23). William Byrd succeeded Parsons as Gentleman of the Chapel Royal.

Today, Parsons's surviving compositions form part of the repertoire of Anglican church music. His Ave Maria was included in the 1978 publication, the Oxford Book of Tudor Anthems.

== See also ==
- Tudor music
- List of Anglican church composers
