= John Parsons (organist) =

English organist and composer

- Born: 1563
- Origin: England
- Died: 1623 (aged 59–60)
- Genres: Liturgical
- Occupation(s): Organist, composer
- Instrument: Pipe organ
- Spouse: Jane (m. 1600)

John Parsons (1563–1623) was an English organist and composer of church music. From 1621 he was organist at Westminster Abbey in London.

== Life ==
He was born in 1563, and is thought to be a son of the composer Robert Parsons. In 1616, on the recommendation of the Dean of Westminster, he was elected one of the parish clerks and organist of St Margaret's, Westminster. On 7 December 1621 he was appointed organist and master of the choristers at Westminster Abbey, receiving £16 annually, and £36 13s 4d for the charge of the chorister.

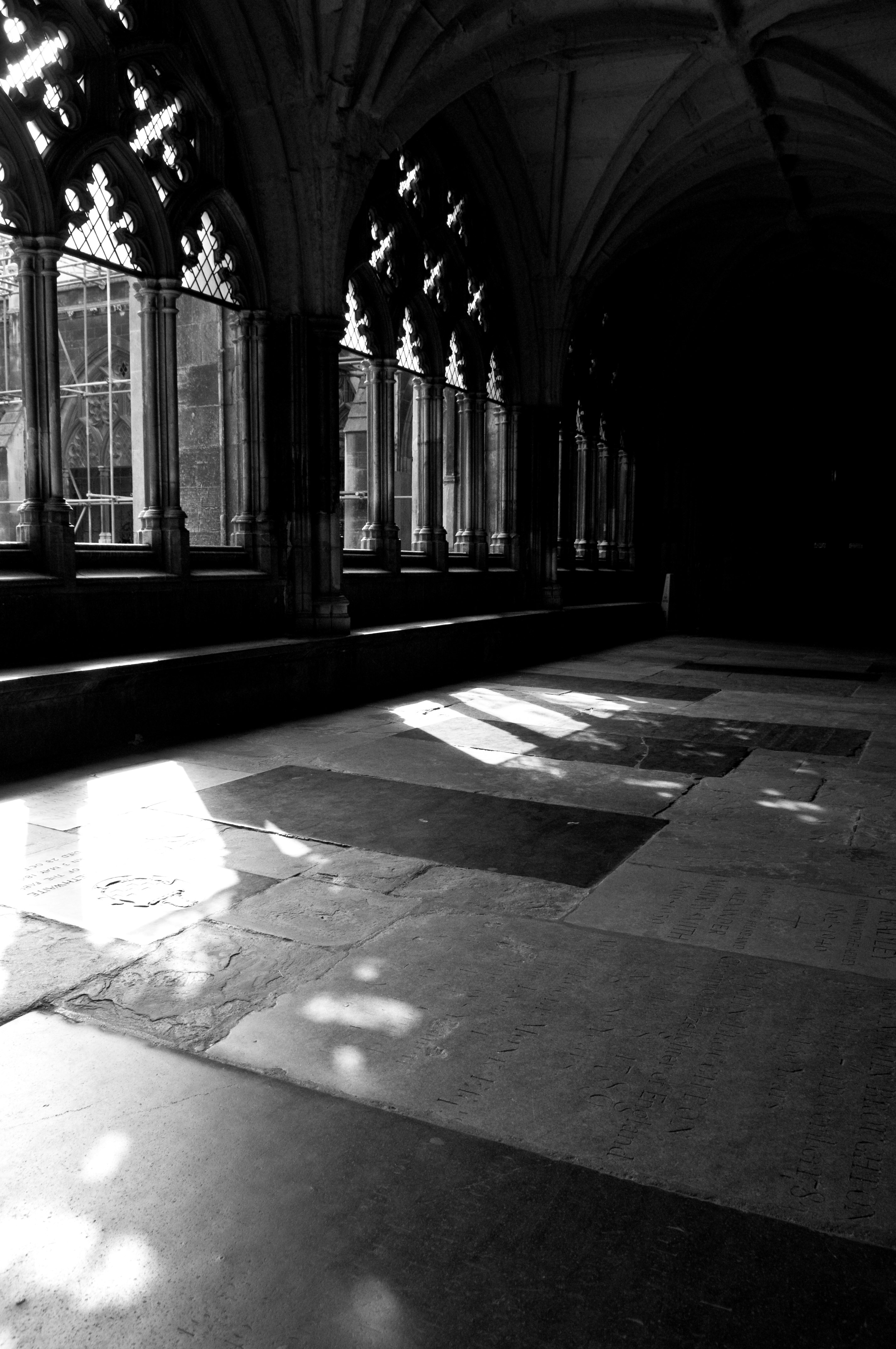
Cloister of Westminster Abbey

Parsons died in July 1623, and was buried on 3 August in the Abbey cloisters. He was survived by his wife Jane, whom he married in 1600, and his children William, Dorothy and Thomasine.

The following lines by William Camden refer to John Parsons:

Death, passing by and hearing Parsons play,
Stood much amazed at his depth of skill,
And said, 'This artist must with me away'
(For death bereaves us of the better still),
But let the quire, while he keeps time, sing on,
For Parsons rests, his service being done.

== Compositions ==
He composed a four-part setting of the burial service. It was published in Edward Lowe's A Review of Some Short Directions (1664), and was performed at the funeral of Charles II. He also wrote anthems including "Man that is born" and "All people clap your hands".

Cultural offices
| Preceded by Edmund Hooper | Organist of Westminster Abbey; 1621–1623 | Succeeded by Orlando Gibbons |
