= William Parsons (composer and copyist) =

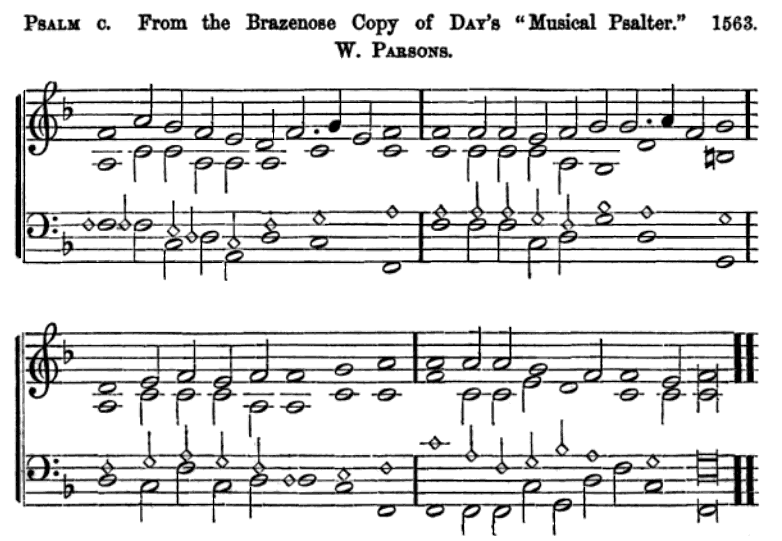
Old 100th psalm tune in the tenor voice by William Parsons. This, the oldest known English harmonization of the tune, was first published in Day's Whole Booke of Psalmes and widely republished thereafter.

William Parsons (fl. 1545 – 1563) was an English composer and copyist from Wells, Somerset.

Nothing is known of his early life. His name appears for the first time in the register of vicars-choral at Wells in 1555. Payments received by him around this time suggest that he was also employed as composer and copyist to the Wells Cathedral, most likely before 1550 where he was the Master of Choristers.

Only a few of his compositions survive, most incomplete. Among them can be cited an Easter antiphon Christus resurgens in two sections, based on a Sarum Rite plainchant; and a motet Anima Christi for three voices, which was originally just one section of a much longer motet for six voices.

William Parsons is believed to be the same "W. Parsons" who composed 81 out of the 141 settings in John Day's The Whole Psalmes in Foure Parts (circa 1561 - 63). The Flatt Service by "Mr. Parsons of Wells" was also probably written by him; the location was added to distinguish him from "Mr. Parsons of Exeter", whose music features in the same source.

== Bibliography ==
- Eitner, Robert - Biographisch-Bibliographisches Quellen-Lexikon der Musiker und Musikgelehrten der christlichen Zeitrechnung. Leipzig, Breitkopf & Haertel. 1900.
- Ford, Wyn K. - "Concerning William Parsons", Music & Letters. Vol.37, No.4 (Oct. 1956), pp.333-335.
- Oboussier, Philippe - The New Grove Dictionary of Music and Musicians, 2nd edition. London: Macmillan Publishers. 2001.
