= Richard Dering =

English composer (c. 1580–1630)

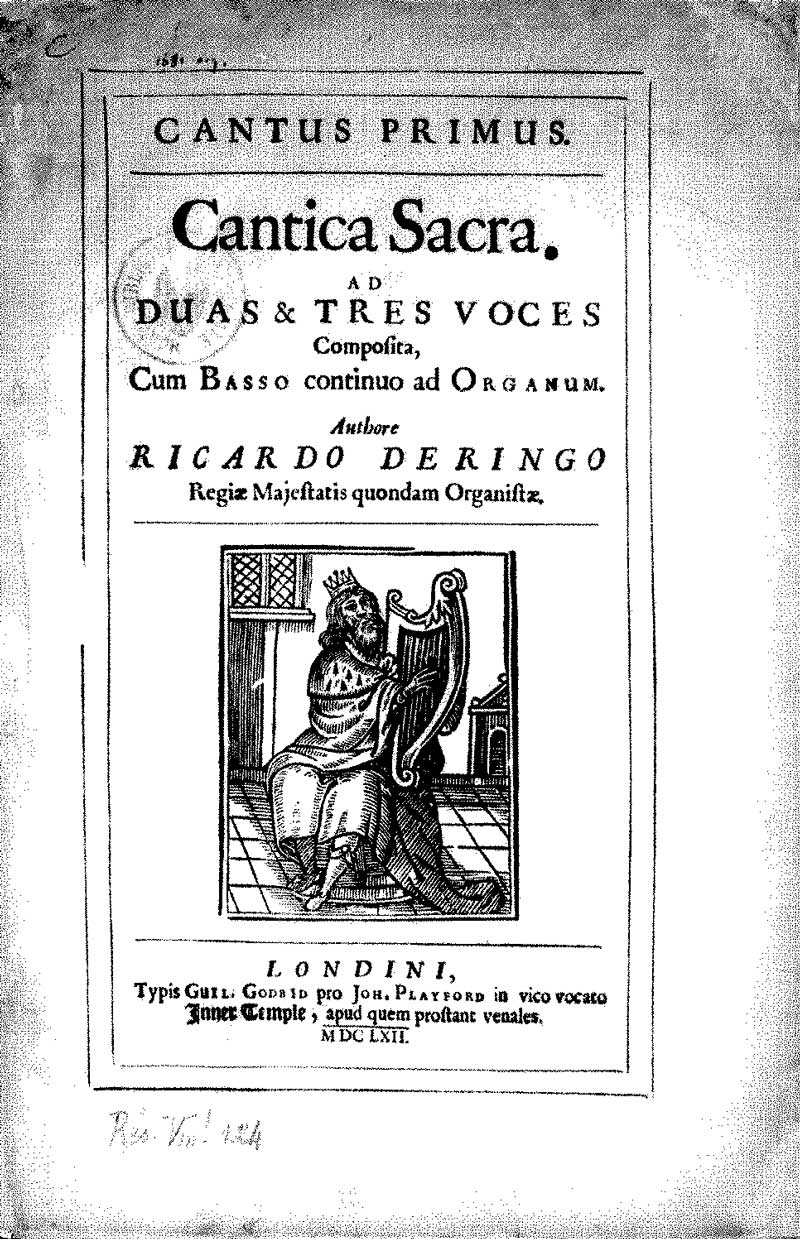
John Playford's 1662 edition of Richard Dering Cantica Sacra I

Richard Dering (c. 1580–1630) — also Deering, Dearing, Diringus, etc. — was an English Renaissance composer during the era of late Tudor music. He is noted for his pioneering use of compositional techniques which anticipated the advent of Baroque music in England. Some of his surviving choral works are part of the repertoire of Anglican church music today.

Despite being English, he lived and worked most of his life in the Spanish-dominated South Netherlands owing to his Roman Catholic faith.

== Biography ==
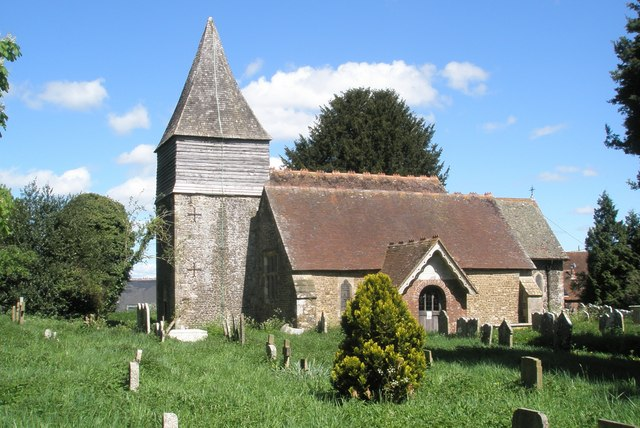
Dering was the son of Henry Dering of Liss in Hampshire

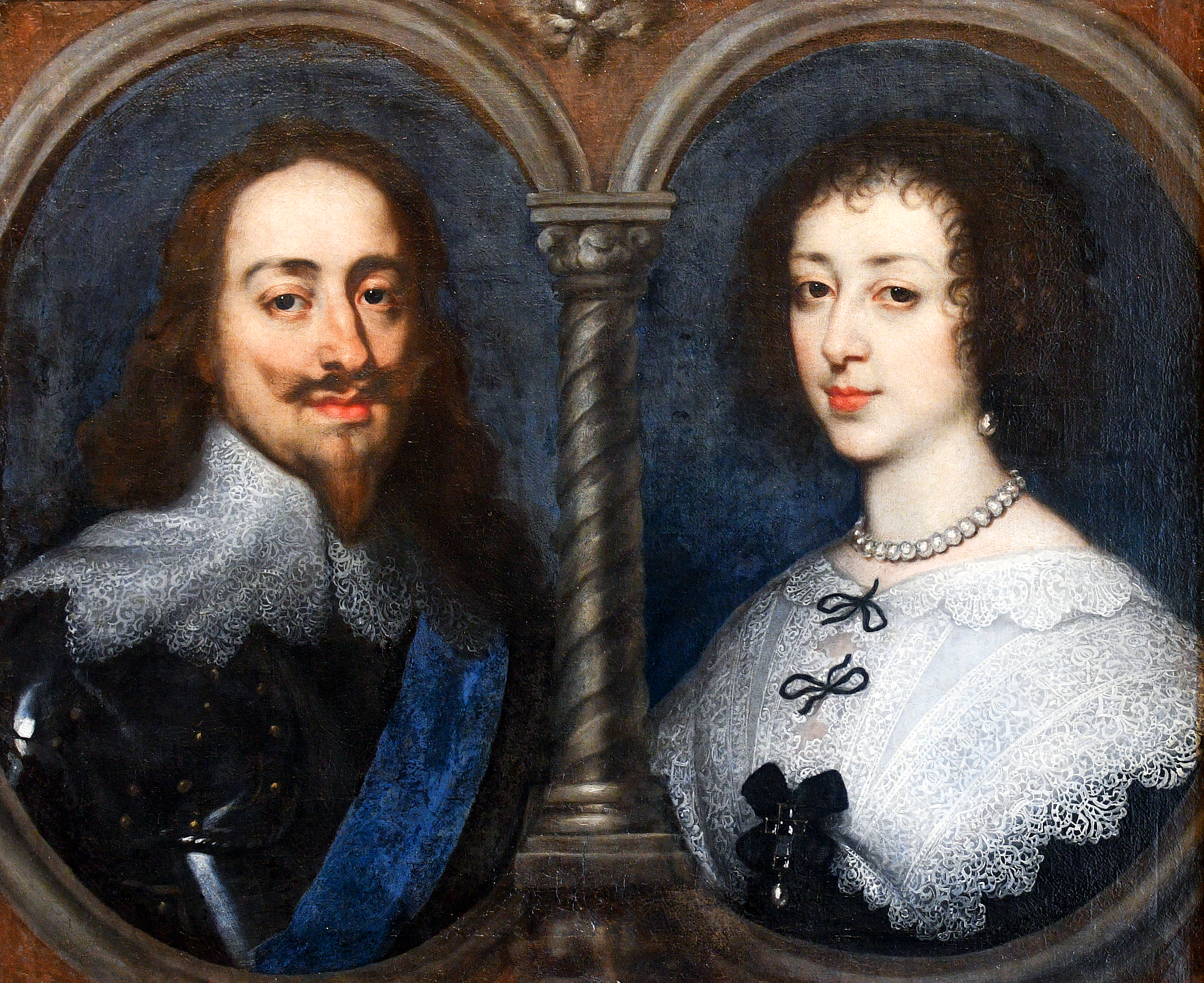
Dering served as musician in the court of King Charles I and Queen Henrietta Maria (portrait: Anthony van Dyck, c.1632)

Dering was born in London around 1580, during the reign of Queen Elizabeth I, the illegitimate son of Henry Dering of Liss, Hampshire. In 1600 he went to study at Christ Church, Oxford, and in 1610 he graduated with a bachelor's degree.

It is known that he travelled to Italy around 1612, visiting Venice and then Rome. From 1612–16 he travelled with the Ambassador of England to the Republic of Venice, Sir Dudley Carleton, 1st Viscount Dorchester.

Dering was likely a Protestant in England in his early life, but it is thought that in his early thirties he converted to Roman Catholicism during his time in Italy. Following the English Reformation in the 16th century, religious tensions were high. A number of English composers who had converted to Catholicism — or were suspected of converting — went to live in exile in Roman Catholic countries in Continental Europe. It is known that Dering visited Florence and then lived for a time at the English College in Rome, a seminary for English Catholic priests. A letter from Sir Dudley Carleton to Sir John Harington, 2nd Baron Harington of Exton dated 25 June 1612 makes reference to Harington's servant, a "Mr Dearing" [sic] who was considering "going over" to the Catholic faith. Around this time, Richard Dering's style of composition is considered to have undergone a sharp change, adopting a more Italianate style.

In 1617 Dering went to live in Brussels, the capital of the Spanish Netherlands, a region of the Low Countries which was under the rule of the Spanish Empire and was consequently Roman Catholic. A number of other English composers had taken up residence there, among them Peter Philips and John Bull, and it is thought that Dering became acquainted with them.

In Brussels, Dering took up the position of organist to a community of English Benedictine nuns at the Convent of Our Lady of the Assumption. There, he published his collections of Latin motets, Cantiones Sacrae (1617) and Cantica Sacra (1618). The preface to Cantiones Sacrae states that the pieces were written "in the first city of the world" — meaning the centre of the Catholic faith, Rome.

By 1625 England had a Catholic Queen, Queen Henrietta Maria, queen consort to King Charles I. Dering returned to England that year to serve as organist to Queen Henrietta Maria at her private chapel and Musician for the Lutes and Voices to King Charles.

=== Death and legacy ===
Richard Dering is thought to have died in March 1630. He was buried in the church of St Mary-le-Savoy on 22 March. The composer Richard Mico succeeded Dering in the post of Queen's Organist.

Dering's music must have had a wide appeal, for much of it was brought out by the enterprising Antwerp publisher Pierre Phalèse the Younger between 1612 and 1628. Dering's two- and three-voice pieces were published in London by John Playford in 1662, long after the composer's death, but they may have been written in the Spanish Netherlands, for one has a text honoring St James as patron saint of Spain. It is likely that Dering took the pieces with him to England: they were certainly sung in Henrietta's chapel, and they were used for private devotion during the Commonwealth (when they were reputedly Oliver Cromwell's favorite music).

== Works ==
Dering wrote three books of motets with continuo, two of canzonets and one of continuo madrigals, and is represented in many MSS and anthologies. His music shows varying degrees of Italian influence; his innovative use of a basso continuo part in his madrigals is considered to be an early example of the nascent Baroque style in English music. The continuo madrigals and small concertato motets are very much in the idiom of Alessandro Grandi or d'India, with wayward modulations and dramatic expression; the Cantica Sacra (1618) contains 6-part motets that recall a more conventionally expressive Italian madrigal-like idiom.

His best-known choral work is his motet for Michaelmas, Factum est Silentium, a dramatic work which describes the War in Heaven depicted in Revelation 8:1 and Revelation 12:7–12:

Factum est silentium in caelo,
Dum committeret bellum draco Cum Michaele Archangelo. There was silence in heaven
When the dragon fought with the Archangel Michael.

This anthem, first published 1618, has found popularity more recently in the repertoire of Anglican church music. Like Dering's continuo madrigals, its dramatic, declamatory style shows the influence of the new Italian Baroque and demonstrates Dering's ability to embrace new musical styles ahead of his English contemporaries. It is also noted as being one of the few anthems in the English choral repertoire to mention a dragon (symbolising Satan). Factum est Silentium has been published in two modern music collections, The Treasury of Church Music 1545-1650 and the Oxford Book of Tudor Anthems.

== Discography ==
- Discography from HOASM

== See also ==
- List of Anglican church composers
- List of Renaissance composers
