= Edmund Hooper (organist) =

English composer and organist

- Born: c. 1553; North Halberton, Devon, England
- Died: 14 July 1621
- Occupations: Composer, Organist
- Known for: Sacred and liturgical compositions
- Spouse: Margaret Hooper
- Children: James Hooper

Edmund Hooper (c. 1553 – 14 July 1621) was an English composer and organist. He was employed at Westminster Abbey from 1588 to 1621 and organist of the Chapel Royal from 1618 to 1621.

== Background ==
Hooper was born in North Halberton, Devon, c. 1553. He is thought to have been a chorister at Exeter Cathedral. Schooled at Greenwich, by 1582 he was a member of the choir of Westminster Abbey where he became Master of the Choristers in 1588. Hooper appears to have been the first regularly appointed organist of the abbey; his patent, dated 19 May 1606, was renewed for life in 1616.

On 1 March 1604 Hooper became a Gentleman of the Chapel Royal. There are several references to Hooper in the Chapel Royal Cheque Book and in the Lord Chamberlain's Accounts for the period. These include allowances for mourning livery for the funerals of Queen Elizabeth I (1603), Henry Frederick, Prince of Wales (1612) and Queen Anne (1618). Part of his salary was received in lieu of John Bull (the first salaried organist at the Chapel Royal) who in 1613 left very suddenly to work abroad. By November 1615 Hooper had attained the prestigious position of joint Organist of the Chapel Royal with Orlando Gibbons. He held this position until his death on 14 July 1621. On 16 July 1621 Hooper was buried in the cloisters of Westminster Abbey, but does not seem to have had a gravestone. His widow, Margaret, was buried there on 7 March 1652. Hooper's eldest son, James, who died in December 1652, was a lay vicar of Westminster Abbey.

Apart from seven keyboard pieces that have survived (two of them included in the Fitzwilliam Virginal Book) Hooper's compositions are all sacred anthems and liturgical settings. Two pieces were included in Sir William Leighton's Teares or Lamentacions of a Sorrowful Soule (1614), and three anthems were printed after his death in John Barnard's First Book of Selected Church Musick (1641). Many of the anthems are boldly chromatic. Examples are O God of Gods and Hearken ye Nations, recorded by the Magdalena Consort in 2019. The latter was written to commemorate gunpowder treason day. As William Hunt points out, "major and minor harmonies are hurled into dissonant collision in cadences that border occasionally on musical hysteria, to express both the horror and the relief of carnage narrowly avoided."

Peter Le Huray pointed out that one reason Hooper's music fell out of general use was that "nearly all of it is set to very inadequate Elizabethan and Jacobean verse", but that Orlando Gibbons, his younger colleague at the Chapel Royal, "must surely have learned much from him, for the two composers have much in common".

Cultural offices
Preceded by unclear	Master of the Choristers of Westminster Abbey; 1588–1606	Post merged with Organist
New title New title created	Organist and Master of the Choristers of Westminster Abbey; 1606–1621	Succeeded by John Parsons
