= My bonny lass she smileth =

Song composed by Thomas Morley

My bonny lass she smileth is a famous English ballett, written by Thomas Morley and published in 1595 in his First Book of Balletts to Five Voices. A ballett was the English form of the Italian balletto, a light, homophonic, strophic song for three or more singers, distinguished by dance-like rhythms and "fa-la-la" refrains. It is based on an Italian madrigal, published by Gastoldi in 1591 (see ref 1 and supporting recording). The ChoralWiki gives the following words for the two opening verses.

My bonny lass she smileth,
when she my heart beguileth.
Fa la la la...
Smile less, dear love, therefore,
and you shall love me more.
Fa la la la...

The song was parodied by Peter Schickele (https://www.schickele.com/composition/twomadrigals.htm) (writing as P.D.Q. Bach) as:

My bonny lass she smelleth
Making the flowers jealouth.
Fa la la la...

The ballett is of form AABB and is in mode 7, the Mixolydian.
