= The Silver Swan (madrigal) =

1612 madrigal by Orlando Gibbons

- Madrigal by Orlando Gibbons
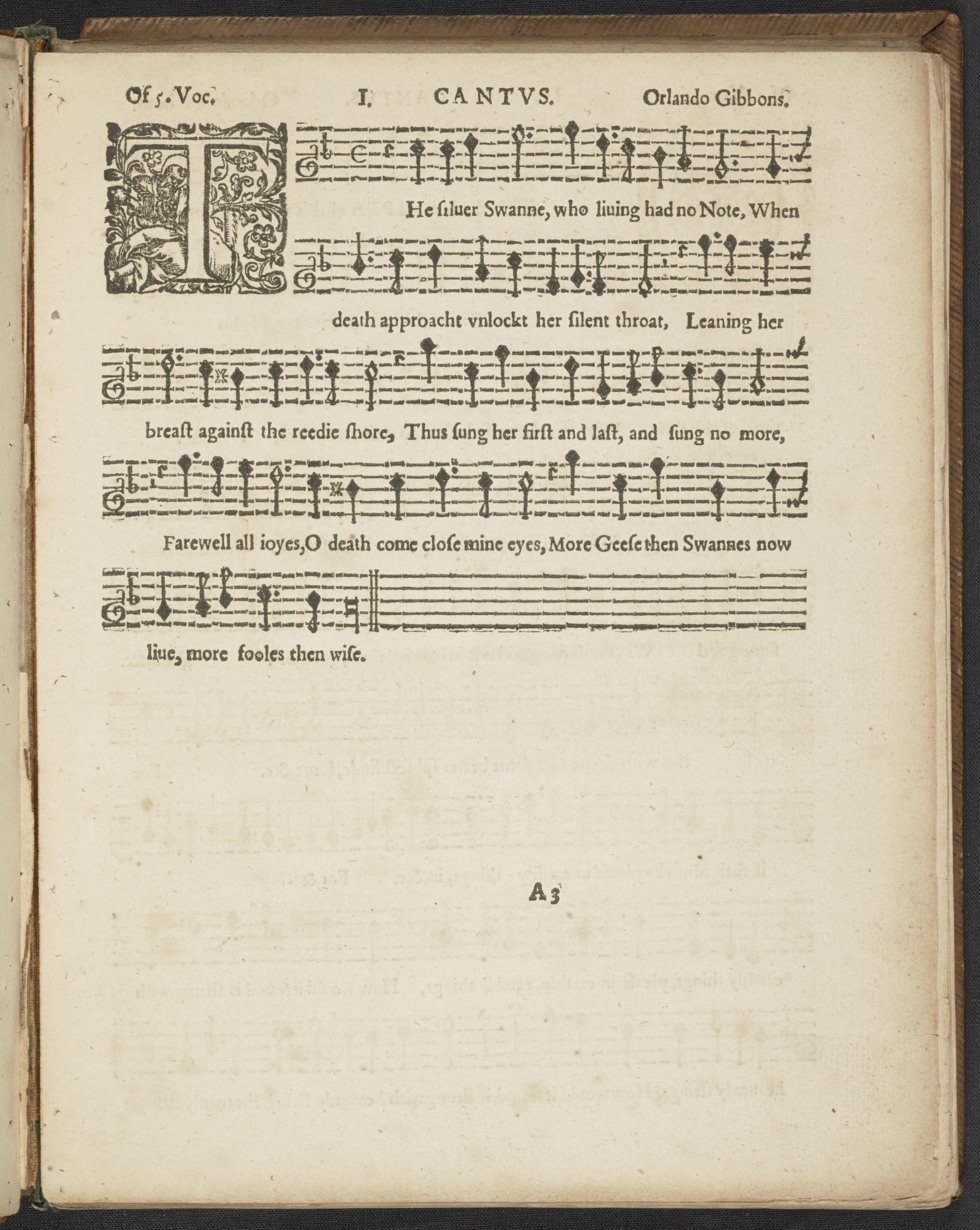
- Cantus part from the original 1612 publication
- Key: F major
- Composed: c. 1612
- Published: 1612, London
- Vocal: Cantus; quintus; alto; tenor; bass

"The Silver Swan" is a madrigal by Orlando Gibbons (1583–1625), composed during the early Baroque period. Gibbons's best-known song and among the most admired English madrigals, it is scored for five voices—cantus, quintus, alto, tenor and bass. The piece opens his First Set of Madrigals and Motets of 5 parts, published in London by Thomas Snodham in 1612 with support from the composer's patron Christopher Hatton.

The musical counterpoint is largely conservative, more akin to Gibbons's esteemed elder contemporary William Byrd than his progressive English Madrigal School contemporaries. An exception to this conservatism occurs when an augmented fifth chord, including a dissonance that is approached without traditional preparation, is dramatically used on the word "death" to achieve a special text painting effect.

The madrigal's poetic text presents a swan song: the legend that swans are silent in life and sing beautifully once just before their deaths. The poem's author is unknown, with Hatton or Gibbons himself variously suggested; it may be inspired by an earlier Italian model. The text has since been set separately by a variety of composers from the 20th and 21st centuries, including Lori Laitman (2007), Ned Rorem (1949), and Eric Thiman (date unknown).

== History ==
The English composer Orlando Gibbons (1583–1625) published his First Set of Madrigals and Motets of 5 parts in 1612; its opening song is "The Silver Swan", printed as The filuer [sic] Swanne, who liuing had no note. Published in London by Thomas Snodham, the assignee of William Barley, the Madrigals and Motets forms the core of the composer's secular vocal music. It is among Gibbons's few publications within his lifetime, alongside six works in the keyboard set Parthenia of c. 1612; two songs in The Teares and Lamentatacions of a Sorrowfull Soule vocal collection published by William Leighton in 1614; and nine keyboard pieces in the solely-Gibbons set: Fantzies of III. Parts.

The entire Madrigals and Motets collection was dedicated to Gibbons's patron, Sir Christopher Hatton (1581–1619), who financially supported the project. Although Hatton was a minor court figure, his brother-in-law Henry Fanshawe—himself a patron of the composer John Ward—was in the retinue of the heir apparent Henry Frederick, Prince of Wales. The origins of Gibbons's association with Hatton are unclear, but the latter evidently became an important patron; Gibbons would name two of his children, including the future composer Christopher Gibbons, after Hatton and his wife Elizabeth. By Gibbons's own account, he used Hatton's London house as a place to compose.

"The Silver Swan" is Gibbons's best-known song, with biographer Edmund Fellowes suggesting it is perhaps the most famous English madrigal. He further described it as "a favourite wherever madrigals have been sung", and noted that it was among the few pieces to retain relevance during the composer's posthumous loss in popularity before the mid 20th-century.

== Music ==
The opening phrase of Gibbons's "The Silver Swan"

External videos
- Apollo5 performs Gibbons madrigal in Plaisterers' Hall
- "The Silver Swan" by Orlando Gibbons via YouTube

"The Silver Swan" is a short madrigal written for five voices: cantus, quintus, alto, tenor and bass. Fellowes recontextualizes these parts to soprano; alto; alto or tenor; tenor or bass; and bass. The song is in common time (4/4) in F major and lasts 21 measures. The poem's three-couplet structure is set by Gibbons in an ABB form; biographer John Harley remarks that "it seems that Gibbons wrote the two B sections with the words of the second in mind". Although the original is without performance instructions, Fellowes's 1914 edition includes accents for text stress, while editions by both George Thomas Smart (the Musical Antiquarian Society, 1841) and Philip Ledger (The Oxford Book of English Madrigals, 1978) include a variety of dynamic markings, and the latter has the tempo indication of "simply".

The entire 1612 set is markedly conservative in its musical language, distinguishing it from the contemporaneous works of the English Madrigal School. Gibbons scholar Paul Vining regards the conservative approach as "well suited to the philosophical tone of the texts". "The Silver Swan" in particular is contrapuntally similar to the composer's First (Short) Service in F, and shows a musical affinity to William Byrd, Gibbons's esteemed elder contemporary. Fellowes likens the madrigal's conventional structure, particularly its repeated B-section, to the ayres of lute composers like Thomas Campion and John Dowland. This older stylism received criticism from composer Howard Orsmond Anderton (1861–1934), who praised the song's memorable tune, but described it as "somewhat slight" and with little madrigalesque imitation. Fellowes, however, contends that it is "universally acclaimed as the most perfect thing of its kind".

An exception to this conservative part writing occurs on the second instance of the word "death" (measure 17) in the poem's fifth line. (Note: The dissonance is intended to heighten the word "death" in measure 17; however, since the B-section is repeated, the dissonance appears earlier in measure 10 in the second syllable of "against", where Harley describes it as "out of place".) To achieve a special text painting effect, an augmented fifth chord is utilized at this moment; although other Gibbons madrigals use this chord type, it does not appear in the composer's sacred music. The latter disparity, alongside the unprepared dissonance, has led some editors to erroneously correct the chord (in The Musical Times 1851, for example); that is, changing the alto/tenor E♭ to D in measures 10 and 17. Fellowes describes the supposed correction as "entirely indefensible". The dissonance is now accepted in modern editions, such as Smart 1841, Fellowes 1914, Fellowes & Dart 1964, and Ledger 1978.

"The Silver Swan" easily permits the lead cantus/soprano part to be used for solo performance, accompanied by four viols; (Note: The original publication's title page includes the subtitle: "apt for Viols and Voyces". A fully instrumental version of "The Silver Swan" was not included in Thomas Campion's The Lord's Masque for a wedding celebration as is sometimes thought; this erroneous information lies in a misprint of the original Campion edition. There is no record of Gibbons participating in any wedding masque, although he arranged a tune for keyboard from Francis Beaumont's production.) in this voice, repeated words are absent and the text is set mostly syllabically. However, Harley cautions that "this is not proof that it was written for solo performance, for the whole song is economical in these respects." He cites this as a rare "unbroken" Gibbons melody, which can "live outside its contrapuntal context", and suggests that the speech-like setting aides the song's enduring popularity.

== Text ==
"The Silver Swan"

The silver Swan who living had no note,
When death approached unlocked her silent throat;
Leaning her breast against the reedy shore,
Thus sang her first and last, and sung no more:
"Farewell all joys! O death come close mine eyes,
More geese than swans now live, more fools than wise."

– Author unknown

Gibbons's "The Silver Swan" depicts a swan song: an artistic trope which depicts the legend of the swan which, supposedly silent throughout its life, performs a despairful song before its death. According to Helen Sword, "the swan song, of course, has long served as a favorite metaphor for both the proximity of art to death and for the triumph of art over death." The tradition dates back to at least 458 BCE with the play Agamemnon by Aeschylus; other notable examples include two separate poems entitled "The Dying Swan" by Alfred, Lord Tennyson and Thomas Sturge Moore.

The author of "The Silver Swan"'s text is unknown; the poet Carol Rumens noted that "most informed commentators have wisely settled for [an] Anon[ymous writer]". Rumens further comments that:

Anonymity may be part of the pleasure of this text. Readers, and, occasionally, critics, dream secretly of poems that elude or transcend explanation: poems that just are. And the author's name is usually the first step on the nettled path of analysis. "The Silver Swan" is that rarest bird, an anonymous but far from artless lyric whose appeal can seem to be pure surface. It speaks clearly from the past to the present without mediation.

Gibbons himself is occasionally proposed as the text's author, but there is no evidence for this suggestion. None of the Madrigals and Motets texts are known to have been set before Gibbons, and "The Silver Swan" text was not set by other composers until the 20th century. It as often assumed that Hatton chose all, or at least some, of the texts. Given his possible textual involvement and supposed proximity to Gibbons during the compositional process, musicologists such as Frederick Bridge have speculated that Hatton wrote some or all of the poems in the set. Harley considers the text inspired by Giovanni Guidiccioni's Italian poem "Il bianco e dolce cigno" (lit. 'The White and Sweet Swan'), which was frequently set to music by composers such as Jacques Arcadelt. In another setting by Orazio Vecchi, Guidiccioni's poem was translated into English by Nicholas Yonge as "The white delightful Swanne [sic] sweet singing dyeth" for book two of his 1597 Musica Transalpina madrigal collection.

=== Other settings ===
The words to this madrigal have been set to music by numerous other musicians:

- Martin Amlin (1984), for soprano and piano, from Four Songs on Texts of Anonymous Poets
- Gary Bachlund (1966), for a cappella SATB chorus.
- Garth Baxter, from Three Madrigals (for voice and piano, voice and guitar, or SATB).
- John G. Bilotta (1976), Renaissance Songs for tenor and piano
- William Mac Davis (1985), from 5 Elizabethan Lyrics for soprano and piano
- Bernard Hughes (2006), from 3 Swans for two sopranos and choir
- Lori Laitman (2007), for voice and piano, or voice, flute and piano
- John Musto (1987), from Canzonettas for high voice or medium voice and piano.
- Qntal (2006), on their album Qntal V: Silver Swan.
- Ned Rorem (1949), for high voice and piano.
- Eric Thiman (date unknown), for tenor and piano

== Editions ==
- Gibbons, Orlando (1612). "The Silver Swan". The First Set of Madrigals and Mottets of 5. Parts: apt for Viols and Voyces (PDF). London: Thomas Snodham. OCLC 1044329199.
- —— (1841). "The Silver Swan". In Smart, George Thomas (ed.). Madrigals and Motets for Five Voices. London: Musical Antiquarian Society. pp. 1–2.
- —— (1 April 1851). "The Silver Swan". The Musical Times and Singing Class Circular. 4 (83). London: J. Alfred Novello: 163–164. doi:10.2307/3370265. JSTOR 3370265.
- —— (1914). "The Silver Swan". In Fellowes, Edmund Horace (ed.). Orlando Gibbons: First Set of Madrigals and Motets of Five Parts (PDF). The English Madrigal School. Vol. 5. London: Stainer & Bell. pp. 1–3. OCLC 16451757. Second edition in 1921
  - —— (1964) [1914]. "The Silver Swan". In Fellowes, Edmund Horace; Dart, Thurston (eds.). Orlando Gibbons: First Set of Madrigals and Motets of Five Parts. The English Madrigal School. Vol. 5. London: Stainer & Bell. ISMN 9790220206849.
- —— (1978). "The Silver Swan". In Ledger, Philip (ed.). The Oxford Book of English Madrigals. Oxford and New York: Oxford University Press. pp. 310–312. ISBN 978-0-19-343664-0. Reprinted in 1987

Lyrics only

- Gibbons, Orlando (2016). "The first set of English Madrigales: I". In Fellowes, Edmund Horace; Sternfeld, Frederick W.; Greer, David (eds.). English Madrigal Verse: 1588–1632 (Third ed.). Oxford and New York: Oxford University Press. doi:10.1093/actrade/9780198114741.book.1. ISBN 978-0-19-811474-1.
