= This is the Record of John =

Verse anthem by Orlando Gibbons

- Verse anthem by Orlando Gibbons
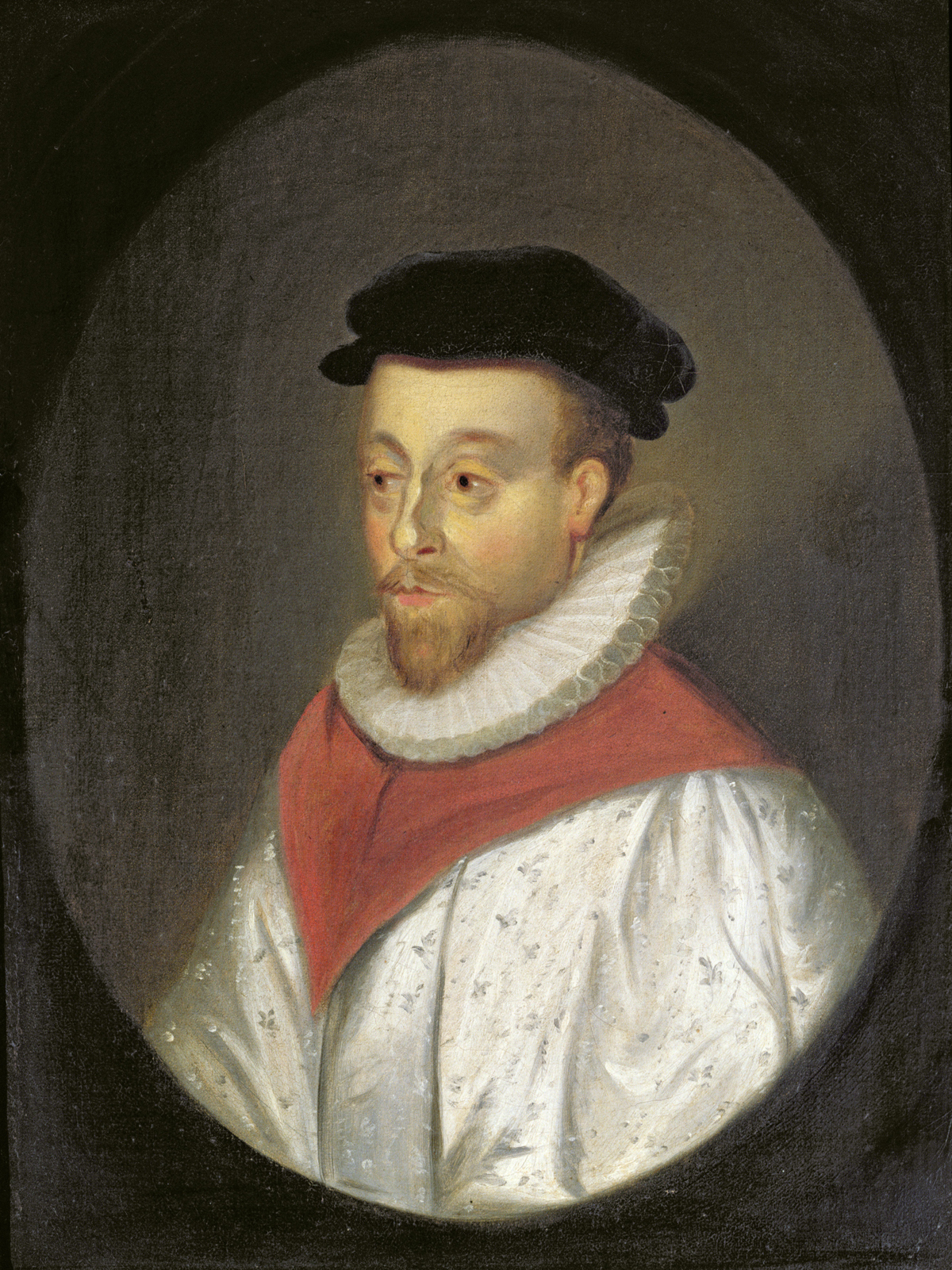
- Portrait of Orlando Gibbons
- Period: Tudor
- Genre: Anglican church music
- Form: Motet
- Written: 1600s: England
- Text: John 1:19–23
- Language: Early Modern English
- Based on: Gospel of John

"This is the Record of John" is a verse anthem written by the English composer Orlando Gibbons (1583–1625). It is based on a text from the Gospel of John in the Geneva Bible and is a characteristic Anglican-style composition of its time. "John" (whose record is being told) refers to John the Baptist.

== Structure and scoring ==
The piece is divided into three sections, each beginning with a verse for solo contratenor (more like a modern tenor, but often now sung by a countertenor) followed by a full section (consort of voices), echoing words of the verse.

The singers are often accompanied by an organ, as in David Hill's recording with the Winchester Cathedral Choir. However, as well as a 17th-century organ part there are viol parts, so accompaniment by a viol consort is another possibility. It is debatable how frequently viols would have been used in Jacobean services, but some recordings take the option of performing This is the Record of John as a "consort anthem".

== History ==
This 'verse-anthem' was written at the request of William Laud, who was president of St John's College, Oxford, from 1611 to 1621; the St John to whom the college is dedicated is John the Baptist. It was written for the college chapel, and presumably received its first performance there. The text forms one of the readings for Advent.

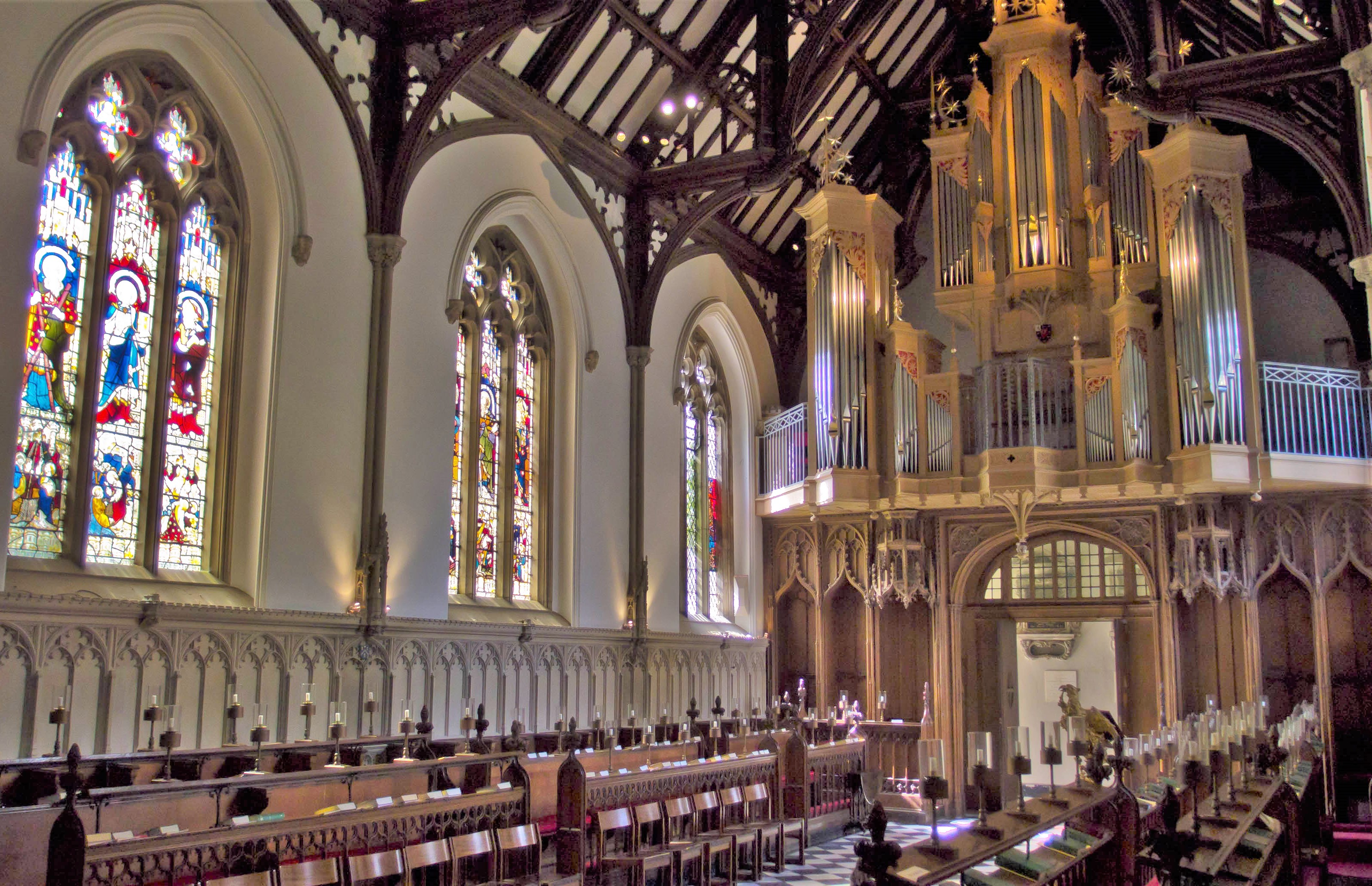
The chapel of St John's College

According to Morris, the earliest known extant manuscripts of the anthem date from the 1630s, a decade after Gibbons' death. They are located at major English cathedrals and chapels, as far from Oxford as Durham, suggesting that the anthem enjoyed wide use when first written. It is included in a number of modern publications, including The Oxford Book of Tudor Anthems (OUP, 1978).

== Sources ==
The text comes from John 1:19–23. It concerns the prophecy of John the Baptist foretelling the coming of Jesus.

Gibbons uses the text of the Geneva Bible; it is very similar to that found in the Authorized Version, which was published about the time the anthem was composed. To give an example of a difference, AV has "one crying" in the third stanza, where the Geneva Bible (and Gibbons) have "him that crieth".

Most recordings use Received Pronunciation. An exception is Red Byrd's version which uses a regional accent on the basis that Gibbons' singers would not have used Received Pronunciation.

=== Verses ===
1. This is the record of John,
  when the Jews sent priests and Levites from Jerusalem to ask him,
  Who art thou?
  And he confessed and denied not, and said plainly,
  I am not the Christ.
  Chorus
2. And they asked him, What art thou then? Art thou Elias?
  And he said, I am not.
  Art thou the prophet?
  And he answered, No.
  Chorus
3. Then said they unto him,
  What art thou? that we may give an answer unto them that sent us.
  What sayest thou of thyself?
  And he said, I am the voice of him that crieth in the wilderness,
  Make straight the way of the Lord.
  Chorus

— John 1:19–23

== Discography ==
- The Silver Swan. August Wenzinger. Deller Consort. Viols of the Schola Cantorum Basiliensis. Archiv (rerelease of 1955 recording)
- Gibbons: Church Music. Sir David Willcocks. Choir of King's College, Cambridge, Cambridge. Decca 2006 (rerelease of 1958 recording)
- The Golden Age of English Cathedral Music. Martin Neary. Viols of the Consort of Musicke. Winchester Cathedral Choir. Gaudeamus
- Elizabethan Christmas Anthems. Rose Consort of Viols. Red Byrd. Saydisc Records 1990
- The Glory of Gibbons. Kevin M. Clarke. Chancel Choir of Church of the Incarnation, Dallas. Pro Organo 1998
- Gibbons: Merrie Noyse. Fretwork. Choir of Magdalen College. 2004
- Anthems by Orlando Gibbons. David Hill. Robin Blaze (countertenor). Winchester Cathedral Choir. Hyperion 2007
- In Chains of Gold: The English pre-Reformation verse anthem: vol 1. Charles Daniel (tenor). Fretwork. The Magdalena Consort. Signum 2017
