= Charles Garland Verrinder =

English organist and composer

Charles Garland Verrinder (1839–1904) was an Anglican organist and composer notable for his career in the composition and performance of Jewish music.

Originally a boy chorister at Salisbury Cathedral, he trained as an organist under George Elvey. He read music at Oxford University, and received a Lambeth Degree in 1873.

He was the first organist of the West London Synagogue, a position he held for 45 years. He brought an Anglican musical background to synagogue repertoire, arranging Jewish melodies for choir and organ, and forging a novel Anglo-Jewish musical identity as well as bringing Jewish music to a wider audience.
