= Verse anthem =

Type of choral music, or song in religious music

In religious music, the verse anthem is a type of choral music, or song, distinct from the motet or 'full' anthem (i.e. for full choir).

In the 'verse' anthem the music alternates between sections for a solo voice or voices (called the 'verse') and the full choir. The organ provided accompaniment in liturgical settings, but viols took the accompaniment outside of the church. In the 'verses', solo voices were expected to ornament their parts for expressive effect. The 'full choir' sections providing contrast in volume and texture. The verse anthems were a major part of the English Reformation due to the use of the vernacular. In addition to this, the use of soloists allowed the text to be expressed more clearly. For the choirmaster they were useful too: the choir only had to learn a small part of the anthem, leaving the hardest passages to a soloist to learn on their own, reducing rehearsal time. Verse anthems developed and were very popular during the early 17th to the middle of the 18th centuries. At the Restoration of Charles II enthusiasm for the older 'motet' style of anthem returned, but composers continued to write verse anthems, sometimes on a grand scale, particularly for the Chapel Royal.

Notable composers of verse anthems include William Byrd, Orlando Gibbons, Thomas Weelkes, Thomas Tomkins, John Bull and Pelham Humfrey.

The "Star Anthem" by John Bull was the most popular Jacobean verse anthem, occurring in more contemporary sources than any other. Of the Jacobean anthems, the best-known in the 21st century is This is the Record of John written by Orlando Gibbons for a visit of Archbishop Laud to his alma mater St. John's College Oxford. Verse anthems have been frequently transposed to suit modern English cathedral choir voices, so Record of John exists as an alto solo as well as the original tenor.

Henry Purcell composed several examples, usually for special occasions like the composition of his odes. For example, The Way of God is an Undefiled Way, apparently a Psalm setting, was to be sung by the famed bass soloist, the Reverend John Gostling, to celebrate King William III's safe and successful return from campaigning in Flanders. The larger anthems are often referred to as symphony anthems as they include, in addition to sections for 'verse' and 'full choir', passages for string instruments and organ alone, e.g. "O sing unto the Lord" and "Rejoice in the Lord alway".
