= Orlando Gibbons =

English composer and keyboard player (1583–1625)

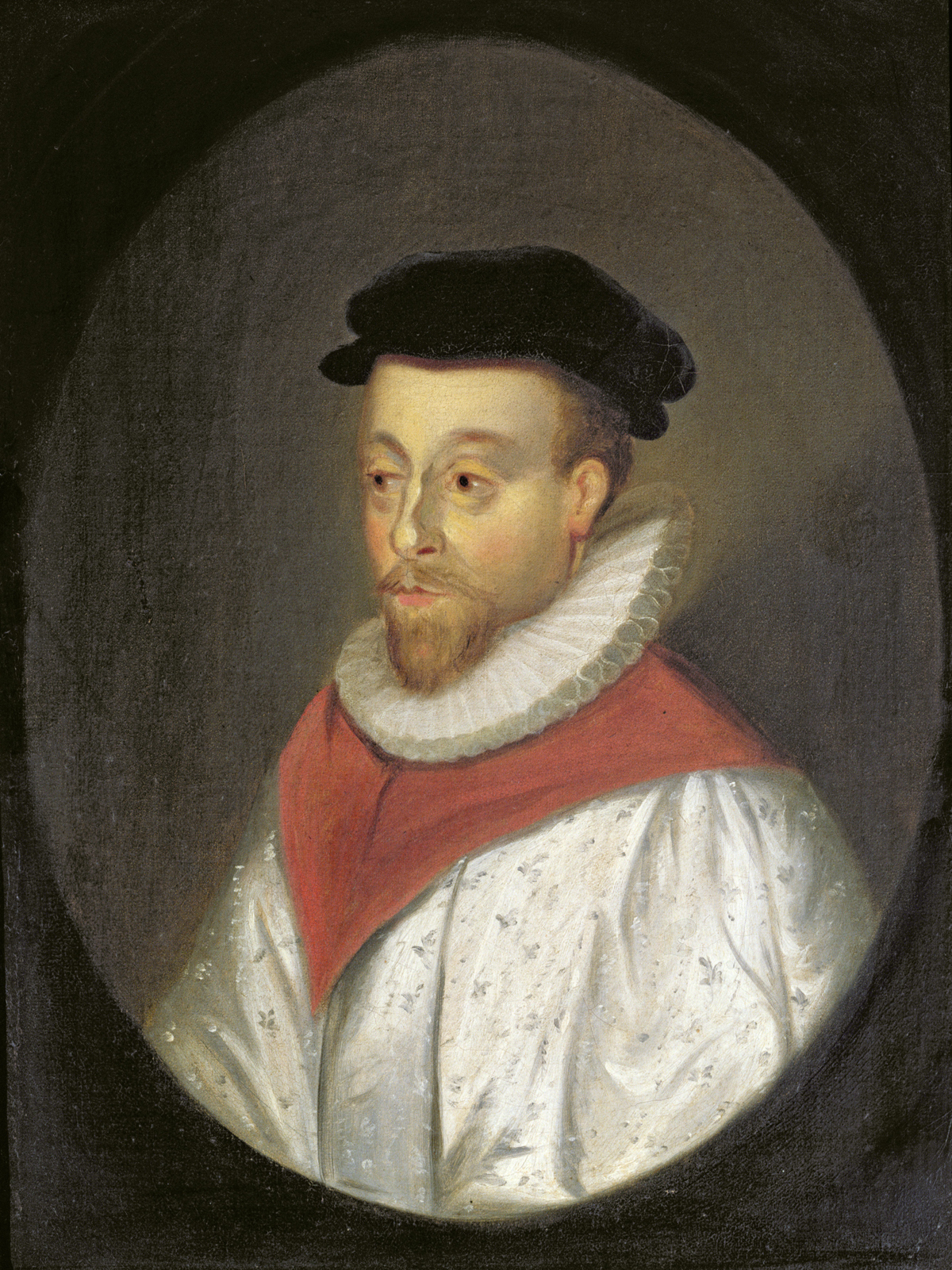
- 17th-century copy of a lost portrait of Gibbons by an unknown artist
- Born: 25 December 1583; Oxford
- Died: 5 June 1625; Canterbury
- Occupations: Composer; Keyboard player
- Works: List of compositions

Orlando Gibbons (bapt. 25 December 1583 – 5 June 1625) was an English composer and keyboard player who was one of the last masters of the English Virginalist School and English Madrigal School. The best known member of a musical family dynasty, by the 1610s he was the leading composer and organist in England, with a career cut short by his untimely death in 1625. As a result, Gibbons's oeuvre was not as large as that of his contemporaries, like the elder William Byrd, but he made considerable contributions to many genres of his time. Musicologists characterize his music as exemplifying the transition from the Renaissance to the Baroque periods.

Gibbons was born into a musical family where his father was a wait, his brothers—Edward, Ellis and Ferdinand—were musicians and Orlando was expected to follow the tradition. It is not known under whom he studied, although it may have been with Edward or Byrd, but he almost certainly studied the keyboard in his youth. Irrespective of his education, he was musically proficient enough to be appointed an unsalaried member of the Chapel Royal in May 1603 and a full-fledged gentleman of the Chapel Royal as junior organist by 1605. By 1606, he had graduated from King's College, Cambridge, with a Bachelor of Music degree.

Throughout his professional career, Gibbons maintained good relations with many important people of the English court. King James I and Prince Charles were supportive patrons and others, such as Sir Christopher Hatton, even became close friends. Along with Byrd and John Bull, Gibbons was the youngest contributor to the first printed collection of English keyboard music, Parthenia, and published other compositions in his lifetime, notably, the First Set of Madrigals and Motets (1612) which includes the best known English madrigal: The Silver Swan. Other important compositions include "This is the Record of John", the eight-part full anthem "O Clap Your Hands Together" and two settings of Evensong. The most important position achieved by Gibbons was his appointment in 1623 as the organist at Westminster Abbey, which he held for two years until his death.

Gibbons developed Byrd's foundations of the English madrigal, full and verse anthems, and by doing so he exerted significant influence on subsequent English composers. This generation included his oldest son Christopher, who would teach John Blow, Pelham Humfrey and Henry Purcell, the English pioneer of the Baroque era. After his death he was primarily remembered a composer of sacred music. Since the early music revival however, increased attention has come to his other compositions, with his keyboard works championed by Glenn Gould, while his madrigals and viol fantasies are popular among early music ensembles. By the 21st-century almost all of his music has been published and recorded.

== Life and career ==
=== Birthplace and background ===
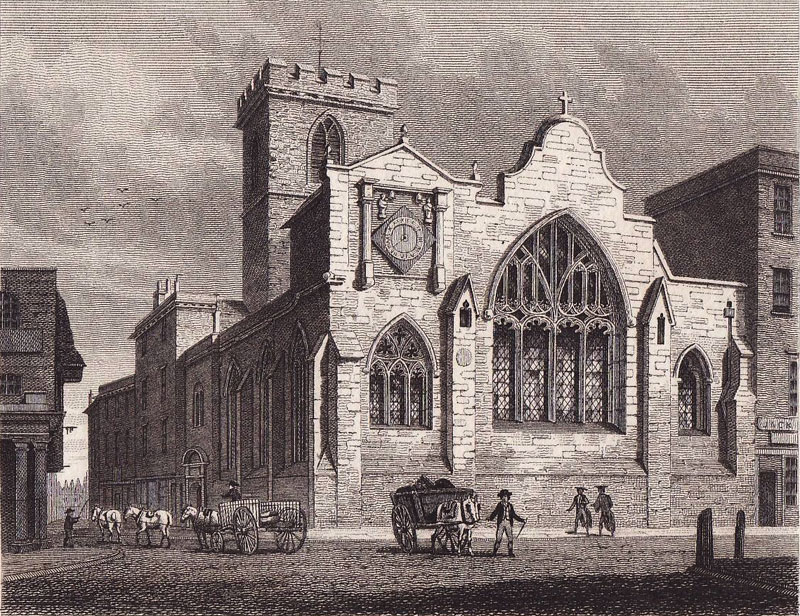
James Sargant Storer's drawing of, Orlando Gibbons's baptism place, St Martin's Church, Oxford, dated sometime before its renovations in 1820

Orlando Gibbons was born in Oxford. Until the early 20th century, he was believed to have been born in Cambridge. (Note: See early accounts in Hawkins (1853, p. 573), Fétis (1866, p. 1), Maitland (1889) and Bridge (1920, p. 34) for instance, where Gibbons is said to be born in Cambridge without noting any doubt.) This was accepted as fact by his contemporaries, stated in multiple early biographies and even recorded on his memorial monument in Canterbury Cathedral, erected soon after his death. It is even possible that Gibbons himself thought that he was born in Cambridge, since he spent most of his life there and only the first four to five years of his life in Oxford. Matters are made more confusing as his father had lived in Cambridge for at least ten years before the birth of Gibbons. Therefore, even though 17th-century biographer Anthony Wood discovered a record of an "Orlando Gibbons" being baptised in St Martin's Church, Oxford, it was assumed that Gibbons was born in Cambridge but baptized in Oxford. Modern historians have proved the claim that he was born in Cambridge to be incorrect. Not only was the baptismal record shown to be authentic, but it was discovered that Orlando's parents both resided in Oxford at the time of his birth, confirming that Orlando was born in Oxford and baptized at St. Martin's, Oxford.

The Gibbons family can be traced back to Richard Gibbons (d. 1577), (Note: Thewlis (1940) first brought Richard's existence to the attention of scholars. Harley (1999, p. 3) noted that Richard is assumed to be a descendent of the Gibbons family, as no surviving Oxford records list any other freeman of the time whose surname was Gibbons. Harley (1999, p. 3) nevertheless characterises the connection as "fairly certain".) who was a glover active in Oxford; by 1549/50 he became a hanaster. Richard's son William was probably born in 1540 and at some point married Mary, whose maiden name is unknown. By 1567, William became wait at Cambridge by 1567. From 1580 to 1588 he lived in Oxford, where he was a city councillor and head of the town waits there.

=== Early life ===
While in Oxford, William and Mary had Orlando as probably the seventh of nine surviving children. (Note: The birthdates of two of his sisters, Thomasine and Elizabeth, are uncertain leading to the possibility of Gibbons being the eighth or youngest surviving sibling. Their first child, Richard, died as an infant.) There is no surviving record of the date of his birth, but he is recorded as being baptised at St. Martin's on Christmas Day 1583. It would be consistent with the normal practice of the time that Gibbons was born no more than a week before his baptism. Gibbons's father had previously lived in Cambridge where he was also the head of the town waits and around 1588, when Orlando was four or five years old, the Gibbons family moved back to Cambridge and William resumed his previous post there.

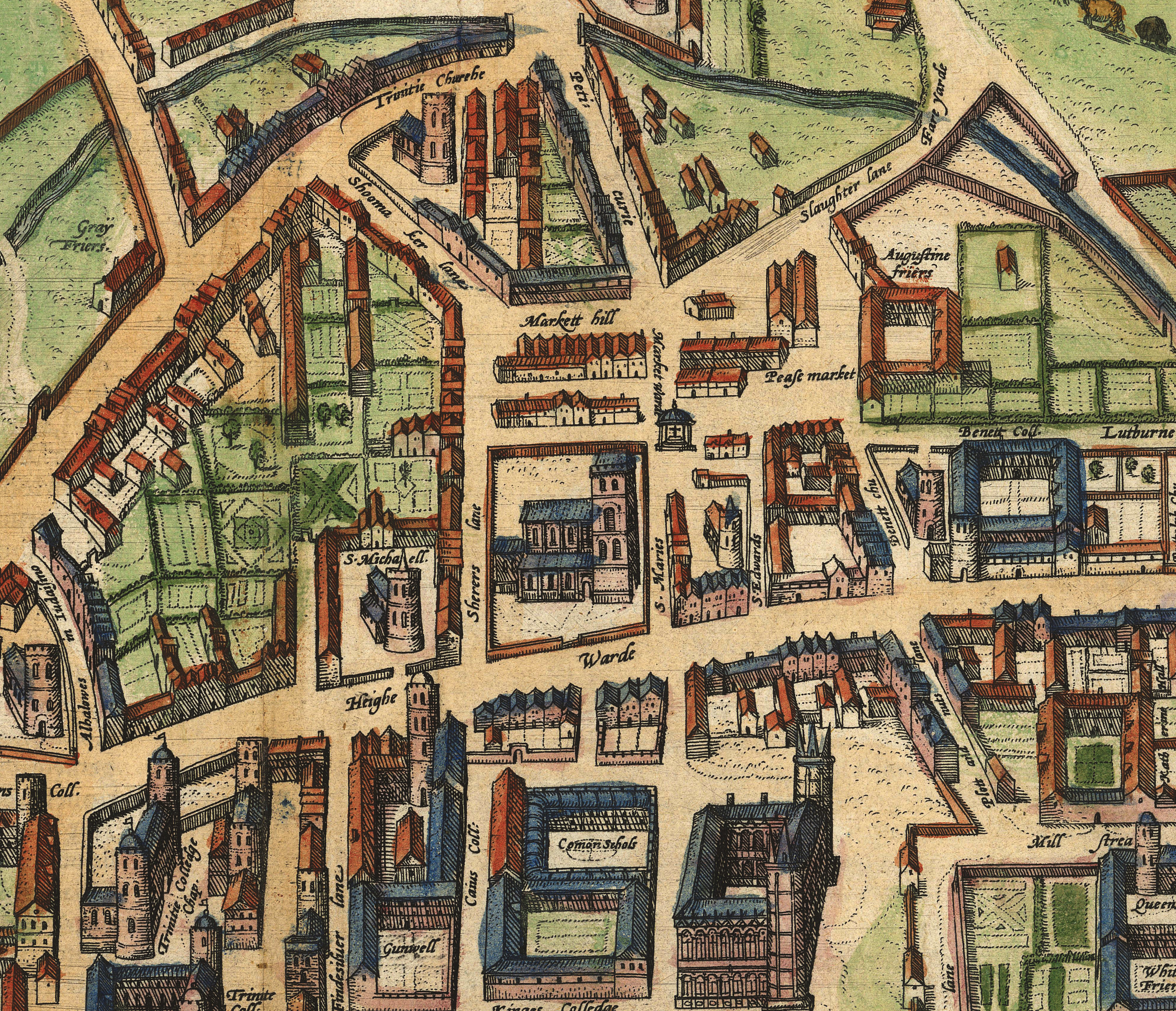
16th-century Cambridge (Map by Braun and Hogenberg)

Orlando was born into a musical family: not only was his father a musician, but his oldest brother, Edward, was a composer and master of the Choir of King's College, Cambridge. His second brother, Ellis, was a promising composer but died prematurely, and his third brother, Ferdinando, eventually took their father's place as a wait. Not much else is known about Orlando Gibbons's youth, but being born into a musical family he was almost certainly instructed on a keyboard instrument and perhaps the viol. (Note: His future appointments as a keyboardist mean that he almost certainly received early instruction in organ and/or the virginal. His idiomatic writing for viol later in life suggests he studied it as well.) At the age of 12, he became a member of Edward's Choir of King's on 14 February 1596. He was a regular member of the choir until some time in the Michaelmas term of 1598. In the Easter term (summer term) of the same year he enrolled at King's College, Cambridge as a sizar, meaning he paid reduced fees but had to do various menial tasks. From 1598–99 Gibbons's name appeared sporadically in the chorus member logs, suggesting that, if not a clerical error, he continued to sing from time to time, perhaps for special occasions.

Gibbons's composition teacher is also unknown. It is possible he continued study with Edward, though there is no record of this. Another possible composition teacher is William Byrd, who was at least 40 years his senior and the most respected English composer at the time. Gibbons and Byrd along with the composer John Bull later collectively published music and since Bull was a student of Byrd's, Gibbons may very well also have been. Regardless of how his musical education came about, Gibbons was known to be composing music by the end of his time at the choir in 1599, aged 15–16. There is nothing known of Gibbons from then until 1603.

=== Early career and marriage ===
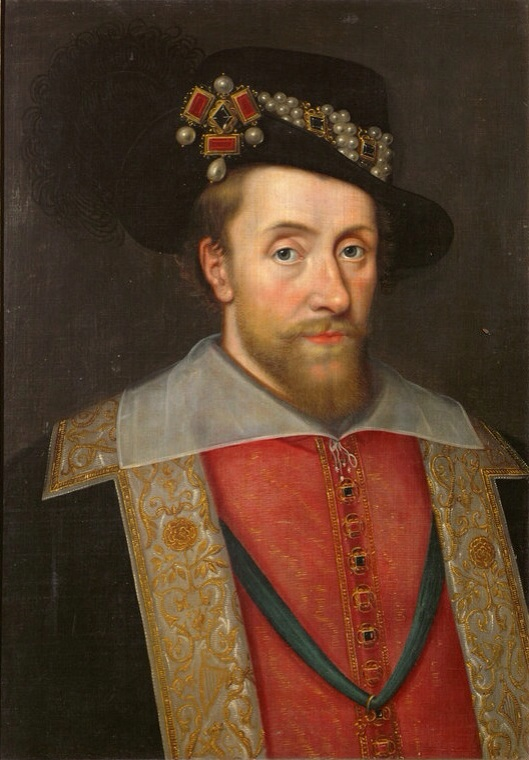
Employer of Orlando Gibbons, James I, who raised the annual salary of Gentleman of the Chapel Royal from £30 to £40 in 1604

Gibbons's abilities had reached the point to allow him become a musician of the Chapel Royal by at least 19 May 1603. The Chapel Royal was a sizable group of priests and musicians who attended to the Monarch and royal household and Gibbons name appears at this time in a cheque book of the Chapel. Gibbons was a Gentleman Extraordinary (unpaid substitute) awaiting the vacancy of a paid position. Earlier that year King James I had ascended to the throne; in all likelihood Gibbons took part in the hymns and anthems of the 25 July coronation. 1603 was a year of mixed fortunes: he received his first position as a professional musician, but in the same year both his mother and his brother Ellis died. The plague may have been what his brother Ellis succumbed to. (Note: The verse anthem How hath ye City sate solitary by their brother Edward may have been a tribute a to the victims of the plague.) Eventually, Gibbons's awaited vacancy occurred with the death of Arthur Cook in January 1605, and on 21 March 1605 he secured the prestigious position of Gentleman of the Chapel Royal, as the junior chapel organist. Edward Gibbons's friendship with the former organist, Arthur Cook, and the senior chapel organist, John Bull, may have helped his younger brother secure this position. Gibbons kept the position until the end of his life.

In 1606, Gibbons married Elizabeth Patten on 17 February. Her father, John Patten, was a yeoman of the vestry in the Chapel Royal, and probably well acquainted with Gibbons, which would have helped to bring about the marriage. When John Patten died in 1623, he made Gibbons his sole heir, residuary legatee and left 200 pounds for his children. Later in 1606, Orlando graduated from Cambridge with the degree of Bachelor in Music. Gibbons and his wife lived in Woolstaple (now Bridge Street), which was in the parish of St Margaret's, Westminster, the church where Gibbons's seven children—James, Alice, Christopher, Ann, Mary, Elizabeth and Orlando—would be baptised.

=== Publishing and patronage ===
By the 1610s, Gibbons had become a composer of high repute and the most distinguished organist in England. He became a close friend of Sir Christopher Hatton, the second cousin and heir of the more famous Christopher Hatton, favourite of Queen Elizabeth I. Though Hatton was a minor figure in court, he became an important patron to Gibbons. The next few years saw the publishing of various works by Gibbons, firstly his 1612 First Set of Madrigals and Motets from the patronage of Hatton. One of the Madrigals in the set was The Silver Swan, often considered the most famous English madrigal. Gibbons dedicated the entire set of works to Hatton: "[The songs] were most of them composed in your owne [sic] house, and doe therefore properly belong unto you, as Lord of the Soile; the language they speake you provided them, I onely furnished them with Tongues to utter the same name". The English musician Frederick Bridge interpreted this as implying that Hatton wrote some or all of the poems that Gibbons set to music in his Madrigals and Motets. However, the musicologist Edmund Fellowes noted that it is unlikely Gibbons was an actual resident of Hatton's household, although their friendship suggests that Hatton may have set a room aside for him to compose. The death of King James's son, Prince Henry Frederick, was a considerable shock to the English, as many considered him a promising heir to the Kingdom. James in particular went into a deep depression; many wrote works to mourn Henry's death, including writers Ben Jonson and George Chapman as well as composers John Coperario and the retired Byrd. Among these was probably Gibbons's Nay let me weep from the recently published First Set of Madrigals and Motets. It is also possible that the full anthem I am the resurrection was for Prince Henry's burial, though there is no firm evidence for this.

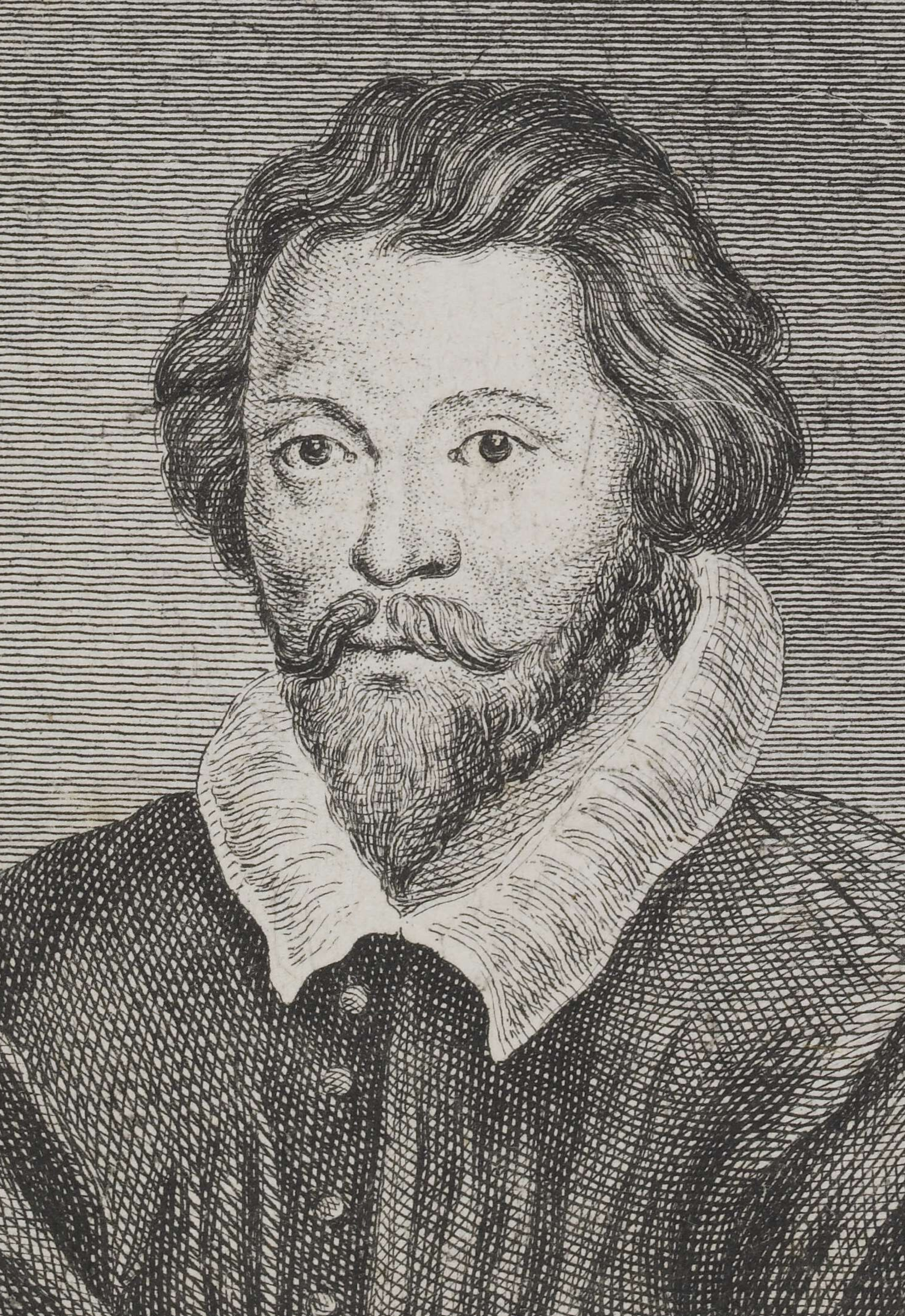
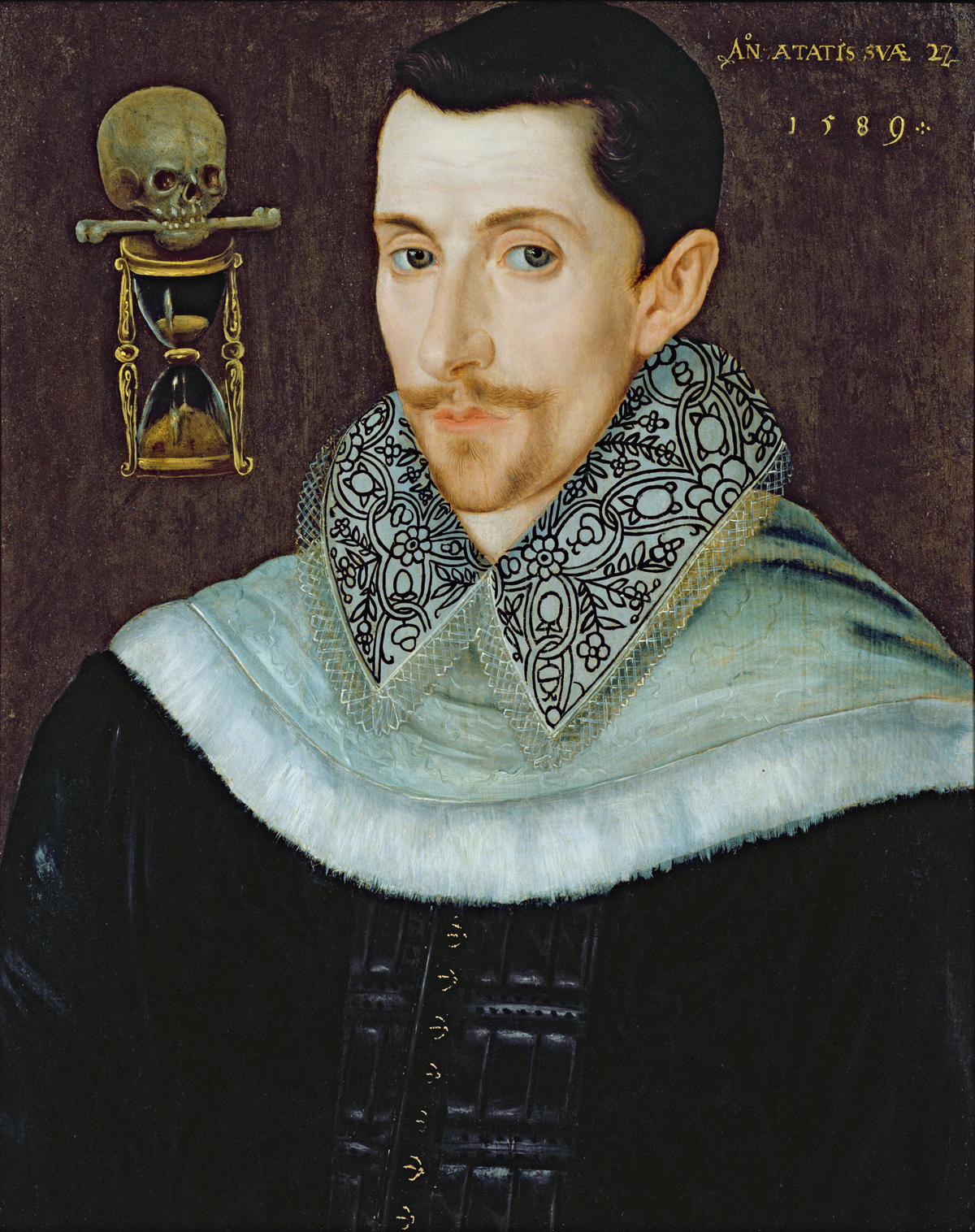
Along with Gibbons, William Byrd (left) and John Bull (right) were the most important composers in England during the early 17th-century. They collectively worked in the service of James I and published Parthenia.

In 1613, Gibbons had six works published in the first printed collection of English keyboard music, Parthenia, which included works by the older composers, Byrd and Bull. This publication was to celebrate the marriage of the Princess Elizabeth Stuart to Frederick V of the Palatinate. Gibbons's compositions written around the time of Parthenia include various anthems dedicated to senior nobles and clergy: the pavane Lord Salisbury for Lord Salisbury, the wedding anthem Blessed are all they for the Earl of Somerset, as well as anthems for Godfrey Goodman, William Laud and Anthony Maxey. Such works suggest that he was well associated throughout the court and that he was aiming for a permanent post. Frederick returned to Heidelberg with Elizabeth in 1613 and the couple was accompanied by a vast entourage, including Coperario and the harpist Daniel Callinder. A list of attendants includes "Gibbons", which presumably refers to Orlando Gibbons, meaning that the composer spent some time in the capital of the Electoral Palatinate. Gibbons seems to have taken Bull's place, who was in financial jeopardy.

In 1614, William Leighton published The Teares and Lamentatacions of a Sorrowfull Soule with two contributions by Gibbons, O Lord how do my woes increase and O Lord, I lift my heart to Thee. Although he possibly started as early as 1605, Gibbons was the joint organist of the Royal Chapel with Edmund Hooper by at least 1615. The same year he received two grants from King James I, worth 150 pounds total. These grants were: "For and in consideration of the good and faithful service heretofore done unto ourself by Orlando Gibbons our organist, and divers other good causes and considerations us thereunto moving". Gibbons continued writing for James I, composing the anthem Great King of Gods and the court song Do not repine, fair sun in celebration of the King's 1617 visit to Scotland.

=== Late career ===
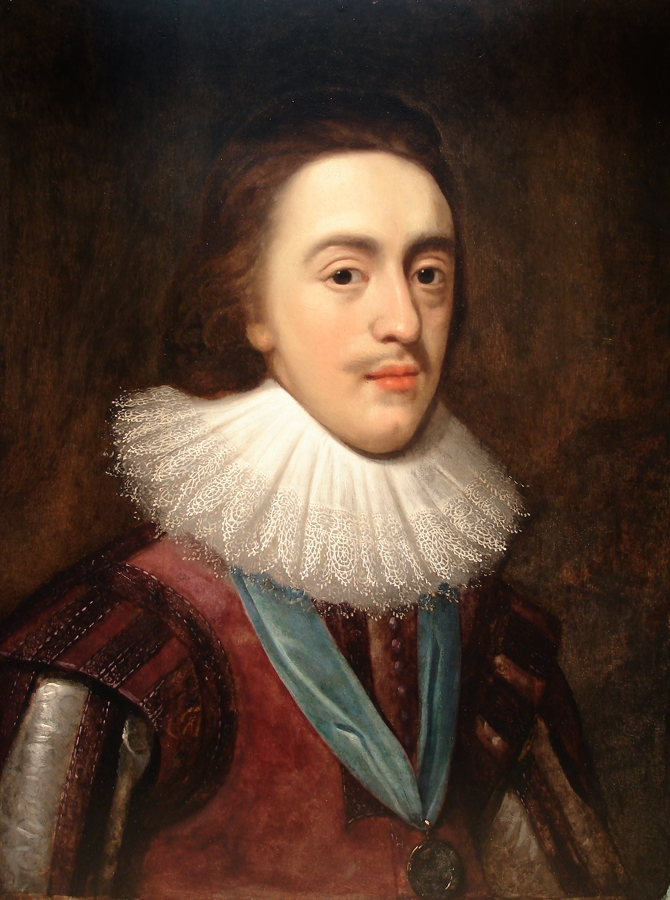
Portrait of Charles, employer of Gibbons, as Prince of Wales after Daniel Mytens, c. 1623

By the late 1610s, Gibbons was undoubtedly the most important musician and composer at court as Byrd had been long-retired in Essex and Bull had left for the Low Countries in late 1614. In 1617, Gibbons gained the position as keyboard player in an ensemble, organised by John Cooper, for the privy chamber of Prince Charles (later King Charles I). Gibbons was the only keyboardist in a group of 17 musicians that included Alfonso Ferrabosco the younger, Thomas Ford, Robert Johnson and Thomas Lupo. The Prince himself was thought to have occasionally joined on either the Bass-Viol or Viol da Gamba. It is likely that Gibbons, along with Coperario, was able to write for this ensemble and had pieces premiered by it. In addition to this, Gibbons probably gained a third position in September 1619, attending the royal privy chamber of James I. His next major work, Fantasies of Three Parts was published around 1620 and dedicated it to Edmund Wray. This seemingly random dedication has provoked much speculation. It may be because Wray could secure Gibbons a better post, or it may be an action of gratitude for having already secured him the post for the royal privy chamber of the King.

While once assumed to be fact, there is now much doubt whether Gibbons received a Doctorate of Music in May 1622. In 1692, Wood stated:

"On the 17th of May, Orlando Gibbons, one of the organists of his majesty's chapel, did supplicate the venerable congregation that he might accumulate the degrees in music; but whether he was admitted to the one, or license to proceed in the other, it appears not."

— Wood (1692, p. 406)

This uncertainty has continued until the present day. Gibbons's eight-part full anthem, O clap your hands was sung on 17 May 1622 at the degree ceremony for William Heather. Heather had financially supported William Camden's creation and maintenance of the Camden Professor of Ancient History chair, and in return the university awarded him the honorary degrees of bachelor in music and doctor of music, even though he was not known to be a musician. The author Sir John Hawkins and musicologists Fellowes and David Mateer state unequivocally that Gibbons was awarded a doctorate along with Heather, and cite O clap your hands as the composer’s qualifying exercise for the degree. Other musicologists—Peter Le Huray, John Harper and John Harley—express some doubt whether Gibbons received a doctorate. Specifically, Harley cites a record in the Cheque book of the Chapel Royal that refers to William Heather as "doctor" but Gibbons as "senior organist." The same writer refers to a letter from Camden to William Piers from 18 May 1622 that says Gibbons is a Doctor of Music. Harley suggests that the authenticity of the letter is uncertain, since the original does not survive; he suggests that Camden could have written something such as "G––––s", which an editor assumed to mean Gibbons. The most convincing piece of evidence is thought to be the absence of mention of the supposed doctorate of music on Gibbons's Cambridge monument, erected in his memory when he died. Although the existing evidence seems to support the conclusion that he never achieved a doctorate in music, there is no indisputable evidence to confirm it.

=== Final years and death ===
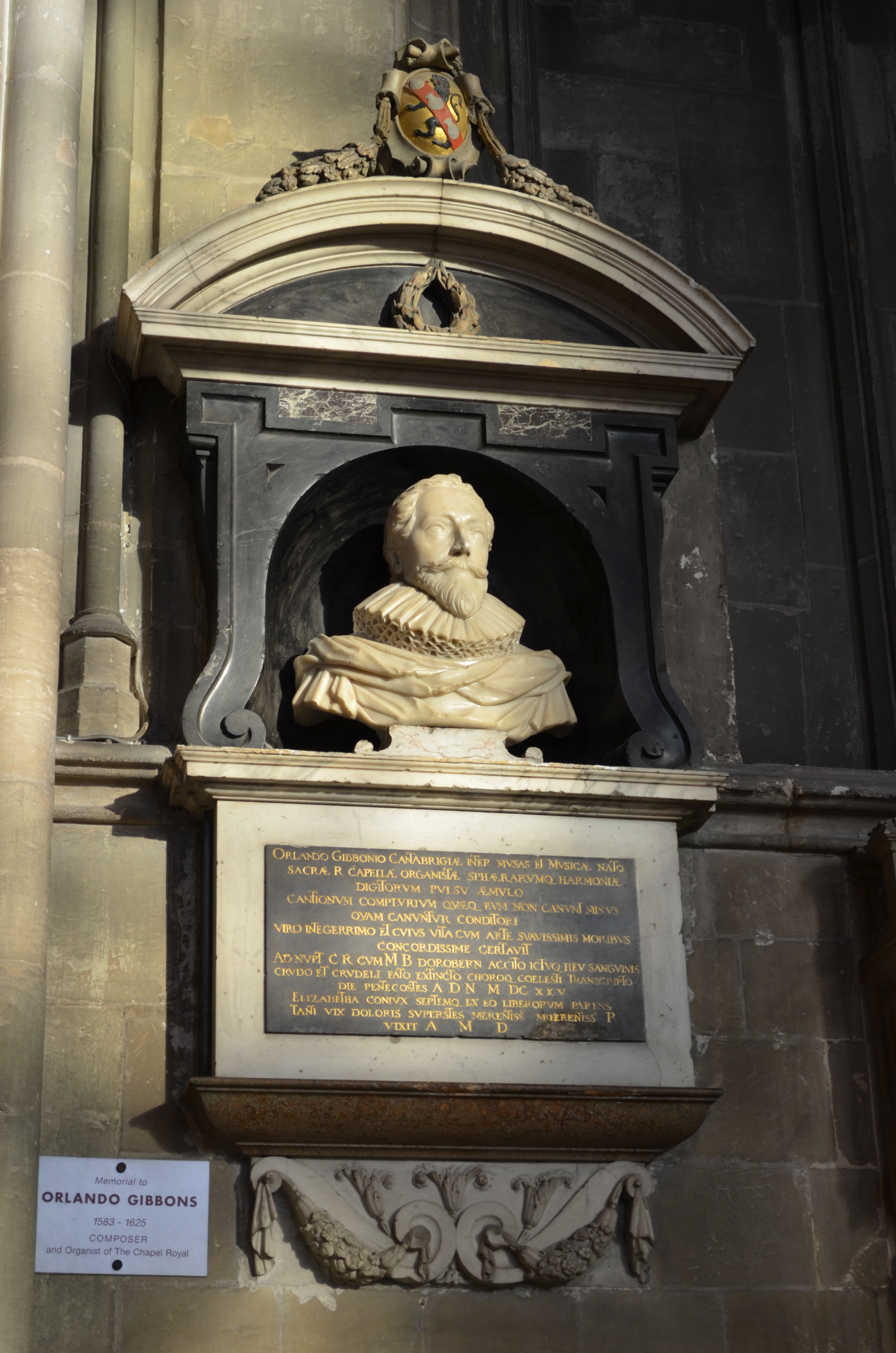
Gibbons' memorial in Canterbury Cathedral designed by Nicholas Stone.

Some time in 1623, George Wither published Hymnes and Songs of the Church in which Gibbons provided the tunes for most of the songs. The same year he succeeded John Parsons as the organist at Westminster Abbey, with Thomas Day as junior organist. This was probably the most important position Gibbons had taken in his career thus far and on 7 May 1625 he officiated at the funeral of King James I.

During late May 1625, the English court was preparing to receive Queen Henrietta Maria, whom the now King Charles I of England had married through proxy in France on 1 May. Gibbons and other Chapel Royal members had begun travelling to Canterbury on 31 May when Gibbons suddenly succumbed to an illness, probably a brain haemorrhage. He died at age 41 in Canterbury and was buried in Canterbury Cathedral. His death was a shock to his peers and brought about a post-mortem, although the cause of death aroused less comment than the haste of his burial and his body's not being returned to London. His wife Elizabeth died a little over a year later, in her mid-30s, leaving Orlando's eldest brother, Edward to care for the orphaned children.

== Character ==
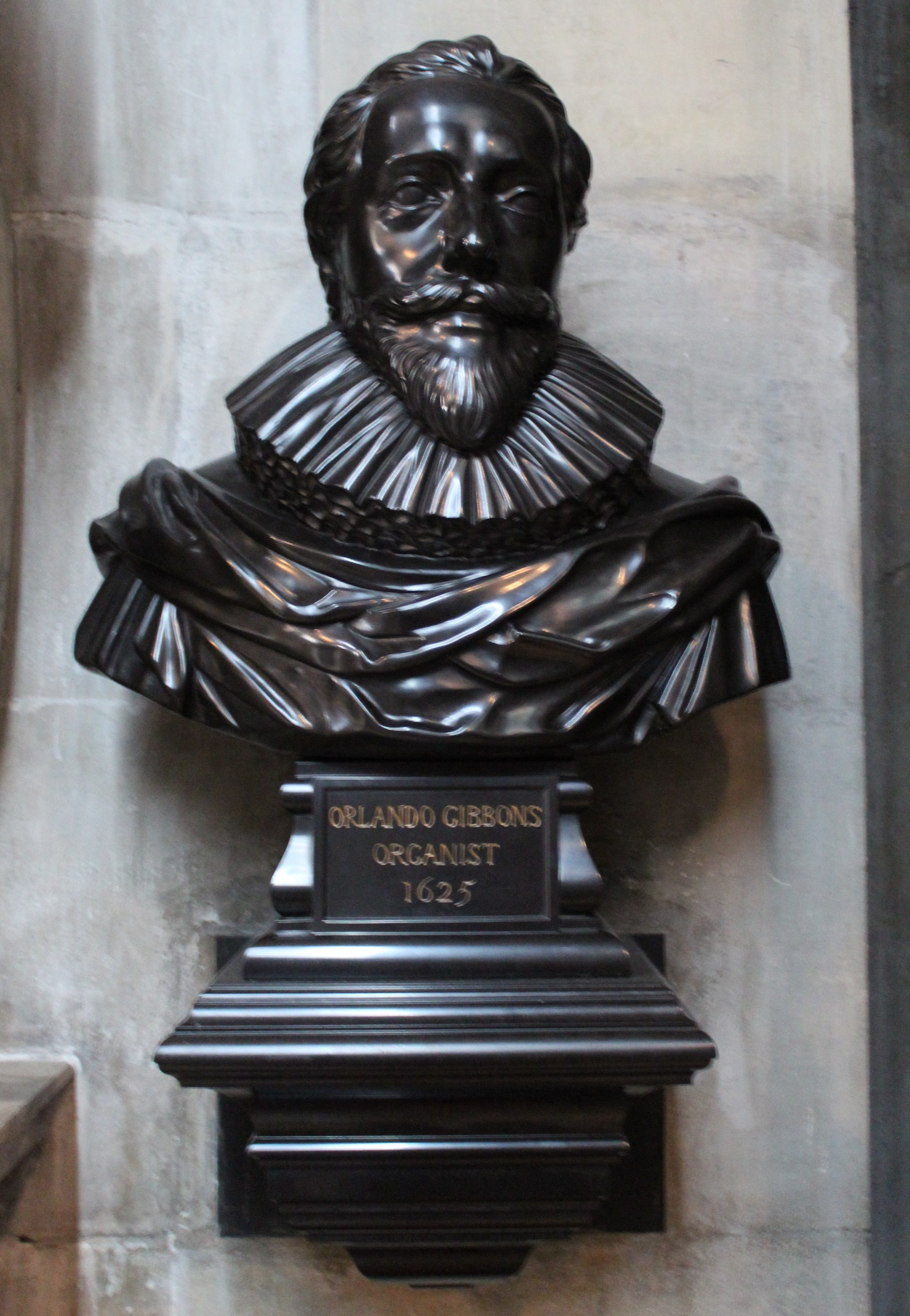
Bust of Gibbons in Westminster Abbey, London

There is little known about Gibbons's personality or character. Harley names this, along with the period between his time in the Choir of King's and his appointment at the Chapel Royal (1599–1603), as the largest gaps in the modern understanding of Gibbons. The lives of his contemporaries Byrd and Bull make Gibbons's life seem comparably dull. Byrd frequently found himself in court—once even against Gibbons's father William—in disputes over property or accusations that he was Catholic in post-Reformation England. Bull on the other hand had to flee the country while chief organist of the Chapel Royal on charges of adultery. One incident in Gibbons's life, however, is described by Harley as "the most bizarre event of Gibbons's career". A complaint in 1620 reported that Henry Eveseed, a yeoman of the vestry, assaulted Gibbons, the report saying: he "did violently and sodenly without cause runne uppon Mr Gibbons took up and threw him doune uppon a standard... and withall he tare his band from his neck". (Note: Fellowes (1970, p. 38) reports this complaint as being filed in 1602, not 1620 like Harley (1999, pp. 57–58). Fellowes's account is almost certainly a typo. Immediately before Fellows's account he discusses events of 1619, and immediately after events of 1621. Additionally, Eveseed became a yeoman in 1611, after Fellow's supposed date of 1602.) (Note: Harper (2008, "Death and posthumous reputation") speculates that the attack by Eveseed perhaps influenced Gibbons later death from a brain haemorrhage.) Other than this, the relative normality of Gibbons's life suggests he maintained good relations with his employers and fellow musicians. His patron Hatton seems to have become a close friend. In fact, Hatton and his wife, Alice Fanshawe, were probably the namesakes of Gibbons's two eponymous children. Other close acquaintances throughout his life included Wray, his father-in-law John Patten and his older brother Edward. It is also possible Gibbons had a particularly close relationship with Prince Charles; Gibbons's death's "formal observation, investigation, and reporting, perhaps suggests how close he may have been to the new king."

Gibbons's music may give some insight into his character. His career was primarily centered around court, where he seems to have been very successful. Indeed Gibbons's Chapel Royal posts at ages 19 and 21, would have been an impressive feat, comparable to Byrd becoming the organist and choirmaster of the Lincoln Cathedral in his early twenties. Each of the four positions he held centered around his ability as a keyboardist. Contemporary accounts hold him in high regard in this respect; during a 1624 visit from the French ambassador, John Hacket said upon entering Westminster Abbey that "At the entrance, the organ was touched by the best finger of that age, Mr. Orlando Gibbons." John Chamberlain stated in a letter to Sir Dudley Carleton on Gibbons's death that he had "the best hand in England".

== Music ==
Fantasia à4, VdGS No.1GB, Oxford. Christ Church, Mss.732-35 (ca.1630)

Fantasia à3, VdGS No.3GB, Oxford. Christ Church, Mss.732-35 (ca.1630)

Fantazia à2, VdGS No.3, Cambridge. King's College, Rowe Mss.112-13 (ca.1620)
Performed by Phillip W. Serna, Treble, Tenor & Bass Viols with Violone

His oeuvre as a whole suggests he was comfortable composing in the genres he had established himself in, rarely adventuring to unexplored genres.

Gibbons wrote a large number of keyboard works, around thirty fantasias for viols, a number of madrigals (the best-known being "The Silver Swan"), and many popular verse anthems, all to English texts (the best known being "Great Lord of Lords"). Perhaps his best-known verse anthem is "This is the Record of John", which sets an Advent text for solo countertenor or tenor, alternating with full chorus. The soloist is required to demonstrate considerable technical facility, and the work expresses the text's rhetorical force without being demonstrative or bombastic. He also produced two major settings of Evensong, the Short Service and the Second Service, an extended composition combining verse and full sections. Gibbons's full anthems include the expressive O Lord, in thy wrath, and the Ascension Day anthem "O clap your hands together" (after Psalm 47) for eight voices.

Gibbons's surviving keyboard output comprises some 45 pieces. The polyphonic fantasia and dance forms are the best represented genres. Gibbons's writing exhibits a command of three- and four-part counterpoint. Most of the fantasias are complex, multi-sectional pieces, treating multiple subjects imitatively. Gibbons's approach to melody, in both his fantasias and his dances, features extensive development of simple musical ideas, as for example in Pavane in D minor and Lord Salisbury's Pavan and Galliard.

== Legacy ==
In the 20th century, the Canadian pianist Glenn Gould championed Gibbons's music, and named him as his favourite composer. Gould wrote of Gibbons's hymns and anthems: "ever since my teen-age years this music ... has moved me more deeply than any other sound experience I can think of."

In one interview, Gould compared Gibbons to Beethoven and Webern:

...despite the requisite quota of scales and shakes in such half-hearted virtuoso vehicles as the Salisbury Galliard, one is never quite able to counter the impression of music of supreme beauty that lacks its ideal means of reproduction. Like Beethoven in his last quartets, or Webern at almost any time, Gibbons is an artist of such intractable commitment that, in the keyboard field, at least, his works work better in one's memory, or on paper, than they ever can through the intercession of a sounding-board.

— Payzant (1986, pp. 82–83)

Gibbons's death, on 5 June 1625, is regularly marked in King's College Chapel, Cambridge, by the singing of his music at Evensong. A number of his church anthems were included in the Oxford Book of Tudor Anthems.

Musicologist and composer, Frederick Ouseley, dubbed him to be the "English Palestrina." (Note: The "English Palestrina is an epitaph also given to Byrd.) Gibbons paved the way for a future generation of English composers by perfecting Byrd's foundations of the English madrigal as well as both full and verse anthems, and especially by teaching music to his oldest son, Christopher, who in turn taught John Blow, Pelham Humfrey and most notably Henry Purcell, the English pioneer of the Baroque era. The modern music critic John Rockwell claimed that the oeuvre of Gibbons "all attested not merely to a significant figure in music's past but to a composer who can still speak directly to the present".

=== In popular culture ===
English model and actor Orlando Bloom was named after Gibbons.

Cultural offices
Preceded by John Parsons	Organist of Westminster Abbey; 1623–1625	Succeeded by Thomas Day
