= Ralph Amner =

Ralph Amner (died 1664), a relation of John Amner, was admitted a lay clerk of Ely Cathedral in 1604, and retained the post until 1609, when he was succeeded by Michael Este.

Amner seems to have been in holy orders, for he was soon after this appointed to a minor canonry at St. George's Chapel, Windsor. On the death of John Amery in 1623 Amner was sworn in as gentleman of the Chapel Royal, where he sang bass. On this his canonry at Windsor was declared vacant; but on the mediation of Charles I (then Prince of Wales) he was allowed by the dean and chapter to retain it. He was present at the coronation of Charles II, and died at Windsor 3 March 1663–4. In Hilton's ‘Catch that Catch Can’ (1667) there is a ‘catch instead of an epitaph upon Mr. Ralph Amner of Windsor (commonly called the Bull-Speaker), the music of which is by Dr. Child.’
