= John Amner =

English composer (1579–1641)

John Amner (1579–1641) was an English composer.

A composer of sacred works, Amner was born in Ely and had a close association with Ely Cathedral, even before his employment there as Informator choristarum (1610–1641), through his relatives Michael and Ralph Amner, who were both lay clerks there. He received his Bachelor of Music from Oxford with the support of the Earl of Bath in 1613, and also from Cambridge in 1640. He was employed as both an organist and clergyman at the Cathedral after he obtained his first degree. He was subsequently ordained to the diaconate, later becoming vicarius (minor canon). In 1615, he published a collection entitled Sacred Hymnes of 3, 4, 5 and 6 parts for the Voyces and Vyols, which represents most of his known works. His other works include Preces (both for five voices), four settings of the daily canticles, several simple four-part anthems, slightly more complex five-part anthems, and verse anthems. Roughly a dozen of these works were recorded in the 1990s, and many were performed by the choir of Ely Cathedral, including Blessed be the Lord God; Hear, O Lord; Have mercy; I will sing unto the Lord as long as I live; My Lord is hence removed and laid; O sing unto the Lord; O ye little flock; the Second Service (Cesar's) and Sing, O heavn's. Amner also wrote a pavan and galliard for viols and a single keyboard piece that stands out historically as the only recognized group of variations on a metrical psalm tune (O Lord in thee is all my trust).

== Works, editions and recordings ==
- A stranger here
- Christ rising again
- Come, let's rejoice
- Lift up your heads, O ye gates
- Magnificat and Nunc Dimittis (Dorian)
- O God my King
- O ye little flock
- Sing O heavens
- Tune thy Musicke to Thy Hart, Stile Antico, Fretwork. Harmonia Mundi 2012.
