= Gentleman of the Chapel Royal =

Title given to adult male singers of the choir of English monarchs

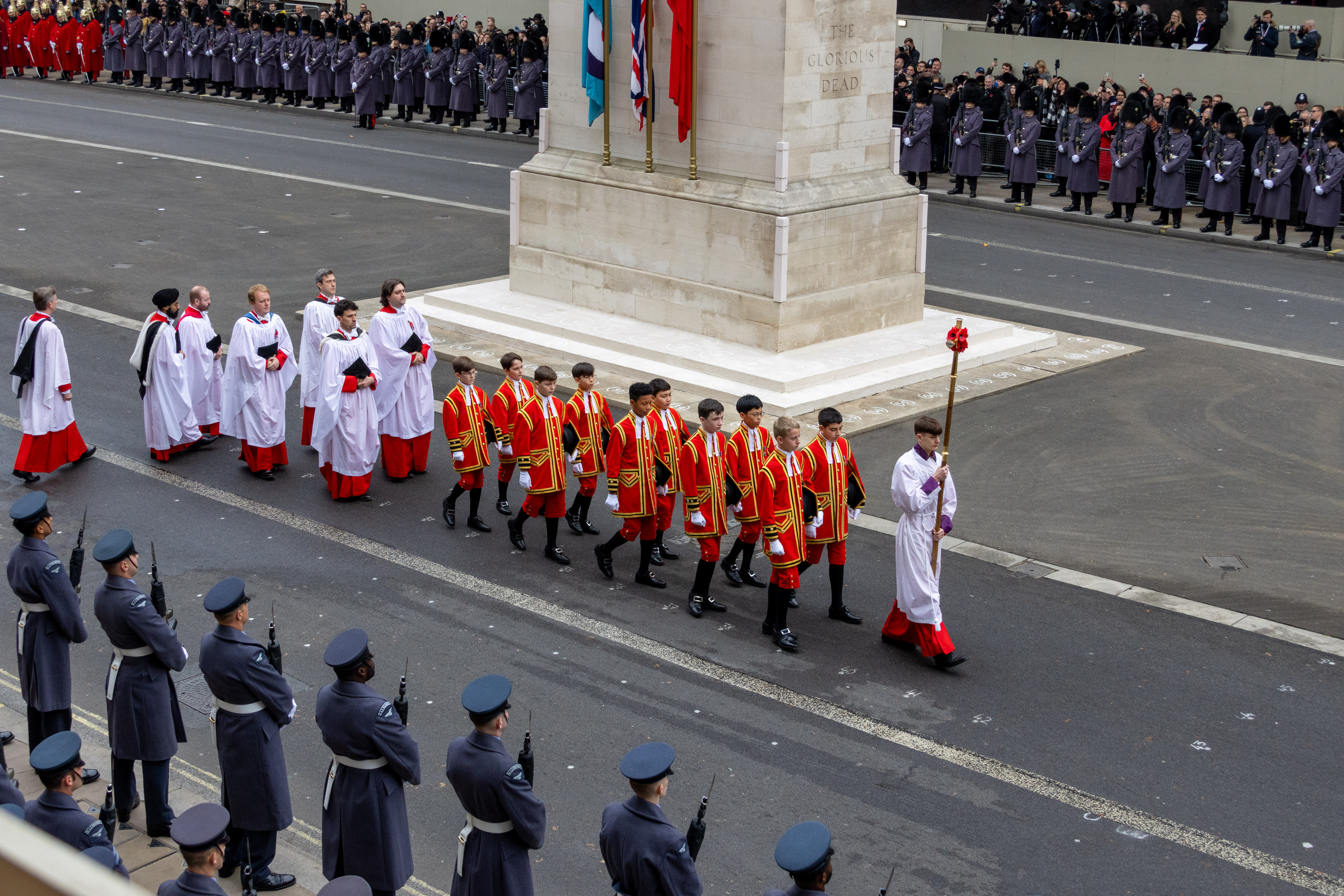
Gentlemen and Children of the Chapel Royal at the National Service of Remembrance at the Cenotaph in London 2024.

Gentleman of the Chapel Royal is the office of an adult male singer of the Chapel Royal, the household choir of the monarchs of England.

== Notable appointees by century ==
=== 15th ===
- Gilbert Banester
- Robert Fayrfax
- William Newark

=== 16th ===
- John Bull
- William Byrd
- Thomas Causton
- Richard Edwardes
- Richard Farrant
- Edmund Hooper
- William Hunnis
- William Mundy
- Thomas Palfreyman
- Robert Parsons
- John Sheppard
- Robert Stone
- Thomas Tallis

=== 17th ===
- Ralph Amner
- Elway Bevin
- John Blow
- William Child
- Henry Cooke
- Christopher Gibbons
- Orlando Gibbons
- John Gostling
- William Heather
- Pelham Humfrey
- Robert Jones
- Henry Lawes
- John Lenton
- Matthew Locke
- Francis Pigott
- Henry Purcell
- Thomas Day
- Thomas Tomkins
- William Turner
- Michael Wise

=== 18th ===
- Edmund Ayrton
- Richard Bellamy
- William Croft
- Richard Elford
- Luke Flintoft
- John Sale
- William Savage
- John Stafford Smith
- John Weldon

=== 19th ===
- William Beale
- William Hayman Cummings
- Charles Smart Evans
- William Hawes
- William Knyvett
- Edward Lloyd
- William Winn
- Henry Wylde Sr

=== 20th ===
- James Bowman
