= Charles Evans =

Charles Evans may refer to:

== Actors and filmmakers ==
- Charles Evans (American businessman) (1926–2007), American business leader and film producer
- Charles Evans Jr. (born 1963), his son, film producer
- Carlo Burton, aka Charles Evans, film actor, producer and director

== Sportspeople ==
- Charles Evans (cricketer, born 1866) (1866–1956), English cricketer
- Charles Evans (cricketer, born 1851) (1851–1909), English cricketer and British Army officer
- Charles Evans (footballer) (1897–1939), Welsh footballer
- Charley Evans, Negro league baseball player
- Chick Evans (Charles E. Evans, Jr., 1890–1979), American amateur golfer
- Chuck Evans (linebacker) (born 1956), American football linebacker
- Chuck Evans (fullback) (Charles Evans, 1967–2008), American football fullback
- Chuck Evans (basketball) (born 1971), American basketball player
- Charles Evans Jr. (racing driver) (born 1989), American stock car racing driver

== Politicians ==
- Charles Evans (politician) (1882–1947), Liberal party member of the Canadian House of Commons
- Charles R. Evans (1866–1954), American representative from Nevada

== Judges and attorneys ==
- Charles Evans (Pennsylvania philanthropist) (1768–1847), American attorney and philanthropist
  - Charles Evans Cemetery, a historic, nonsectarian cemetery in Reading, Pennsylvania, founded by the philanthropist
- Charles Evans Hughes (1862–1948), American Republican politician and chief justice of the U.S. Supreme Court
- Charles Evans Hughes Jr. (1889–1950), American solicitor general
- Charles Evans Whittaker (1901–1973), American associate justice of the Supreme Court

== Others ==
- Sir Charles Evans (Royal Navy officer) (1908–1981), British admiral
- Charles Evans (librarian) (1850–1935), American librarian and bibliographer
- Sir Charles Evans (mountaineer) (1918–1995), British mountaineer, surgeon, and educator
- Charles Albert Evans (1912–2008), American physician and microbiologist
- Charles L. Evans (born 1958), president of the Federal Reserve Bank of Chicago
- Sir Charles Lovatt Evans (1884–1968), British physiologist
- Charles Smart Evans (1778–1849), English vocalist and composer
- Charles R. Evans (scientist), fellow of the American Physical Society
- Charles Evans Hughes III (1915–1985), American architect
- Charles Evans (colonial businessman) (1827–1881)
- Charles Evans (railway manager) (1845–1920), commissioner for railways with the Queensland Government Railways
- Charles Hellier Davies Evans (1873–1956), New Zealand Army officer

== See also ==
- Charlie Evans (disambiguation)
