= Master of the Children of the Chapel Royal =

Choirmaster of the Chapel Royal of England

The Master of the Children of the Chapel Royal was the choirmaster of the Chapel Royal of England. They were responsible for the musical direction of the choir, which consisted of the Gentlemen of the Chapel and Children of the Chapel. In some periods regarded as the most prestigious choral directorship in the country, the holder was given power to take boys into service from the leading cathedral choirs.

The post was abolished in 1923, having been replaced by the newly-combined position of Organist, Choirmaster and Composer at H. M. Chapel Royal.

== Description ==
As well as singing in divine service in the chapel, in Tudor times the Masters of the Children were also involved in staging plays with the choristers. Initially these were for the entertainment of the Royal Court, but by Elizabethan times were taking place in theatres for the paying public. This culminated in the Clifton Star Chamber Case when the then Master of the Children, Nathaniel Giles, allowed his warrant for recruiting choir boys to be used for legal abduction of a nobleman's son to act in a theatre in which he had a financial stake. Following this case the practice declined.

Upon the restoration of the monarchy in 1660, Henry Cooke, commonly known as Captain Cooke, who had been a soldier in the Civil War, was appointed Master of the Children and reconstituted the choir. There followed a period of excellence in the choir of the Chapel Royal, with many of the boys under his tutelage in those years become famous musicians such as Pelham Humfrey, Henry Purcell, John Blow and Michael Wise. After Henry Cooke, one of the Gentlemen of the Chapel was usually appointed as Master. The Chapel Royal offices of Organist and Composer were also usually appointed from among the Gentlemen; these two positions were combined in 1872, and later (on the appointment of C. H. Lloyd in 1917) the combined post was renamed 'Organist, Choirmaster and Composer'.

Up until 1886 the Children of the Chapel had been accommodated in the house of the Master. That year, a Chapel Royal Choir School was established to take care of their education (and accommodation); it was located, initially, at Clapham Common, and then (from the 1890s) in a house on Streatham High Road. On Sunday mornings and evenings the boys would travel to St James's and back by train for rehearsals and services.

In 1923 the Chapel Royal Choir School closed and the appointment of Master of the Children was discontinued. Its duties were merged into the post of Organist, Choirmaster and Composer at His Majesty's Chapel Royal (which had been held since 1919 by Edgar Stanley Roper).

== List of office holders ==
- 1444 John Plummer
- 1455 Henry Abyngdon
- 1478 Gilbert Banester
- 1486 Lawrence Squier
- 1493 William Newark
- 1509 William Cornysh
- 1526 William Crane
- 1545 Richard Bower
- 1561 Richard Edwardes.
- 1566 William Hunnis
- 1569 Richard Farrant (Note: William Hunnis appears to have continued in the role after 1575 when the Chapel Royal and Windsor choirs were merged)
- 1597 Nathaniel Giles
- 1633 Thomas Day
- 1654 Vacant
- 1660 Henry Cooke
- c1672 Pelham Humfrey
- 1674 John Blow
- 1708 William Croft
- 1727 Bernard Gates
- 1757 James Nares
- 1780 Edmund Ayrton
- 1805 John Stafford Smith
- 1817 William Hawes
- 1846 Thomas Helmore
- 1886 Harry Alsager Sheringham
- 1892 Claude Robert Selfe
- 1912 Percy Frederick Davis

In 1923 the post was abolished.
