= Richard Bower =

Royal choirmaster of the Tudor period

Richard Bower (died 1561) was Master of the Children of the Chapel Royal from 1545 to 1561, serving under four monarchs—Henry VIII, Edward VI, Mary I, and Elizabeth I.

By 1524 he was singing in the chapel of Thomas Wolsey, becoming a Gentleman of the Chapel Royal by 1538.

A "tragical comedy" play, Apius and Virginia is attributed to him.

Bower was the father-in-law of Richard Farrant, and an associate of Thomas Tallis who was an overseer of his will. He was buried in St Alfege Church, Greenwich.
