= St Alfege Church, Greenwich =

Coordinates: 51.4804°N 0.0096°W

St Alfege Church
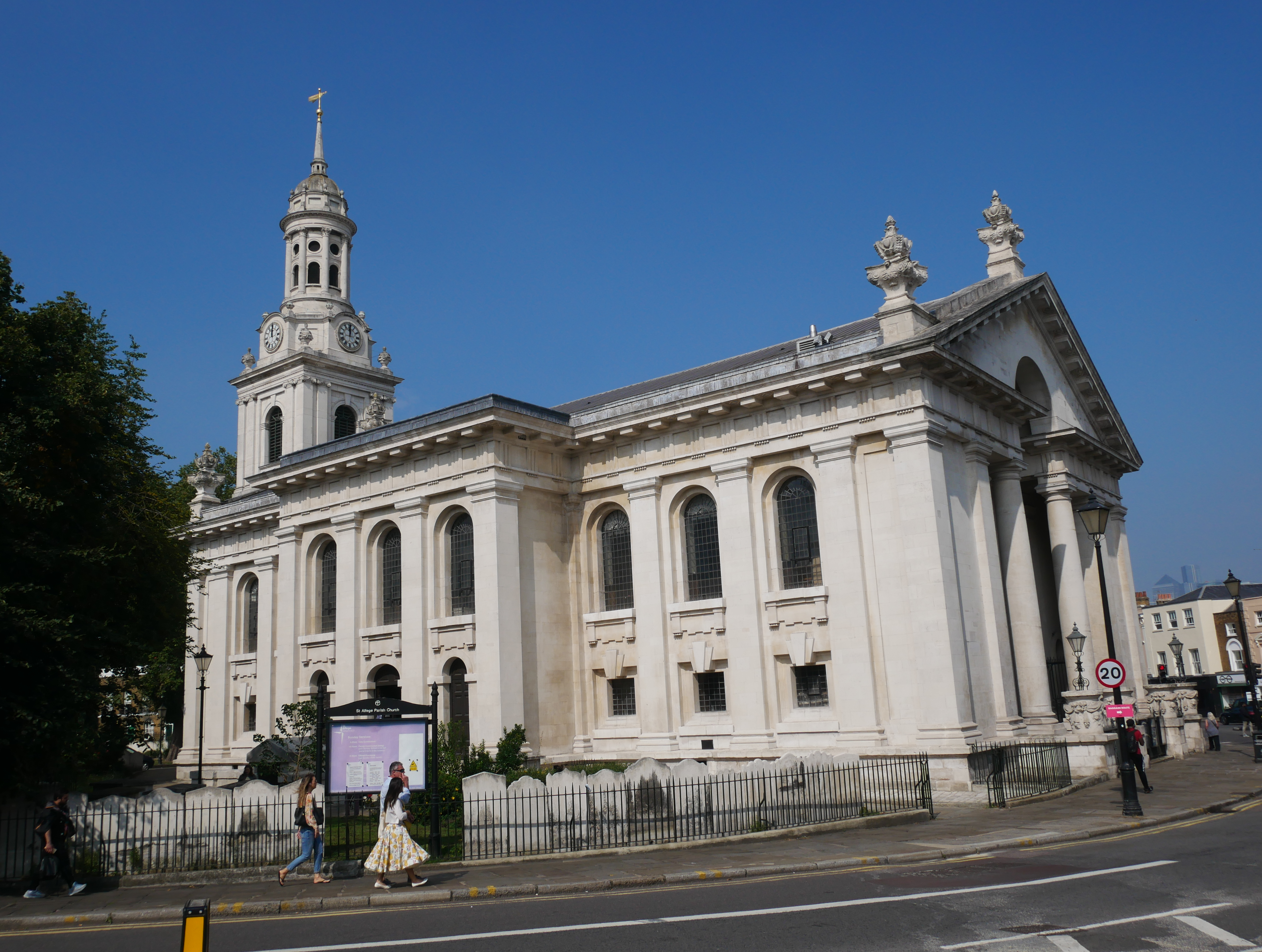
- The church seen from the southeast
- St Alfege Church
- OS grid reference: TQ 38306 77605
- Location: London, SE10
- Country: England
- Denomination: Church of England

History
- Dedicated: 1718

Architecture
- Heritage designation: Grade I
- Years built: 1714 (present)

Administration
- Diocese: Southwark

Clergy
- Vicar: Revd Simon Winn

St Alfege Church is an Anglican church in the centre of Greenwich, part of the Royal Borough of Greenwich in London.Of medieval origin, it reputedly marks the site where Alfege, Archbishop of Canterbury, was martyred in 1012. The present building was constructed in 1712–1714 to the designs of Nicholas Hawksmoor following the collapse of the medieval church.

== Early history ==
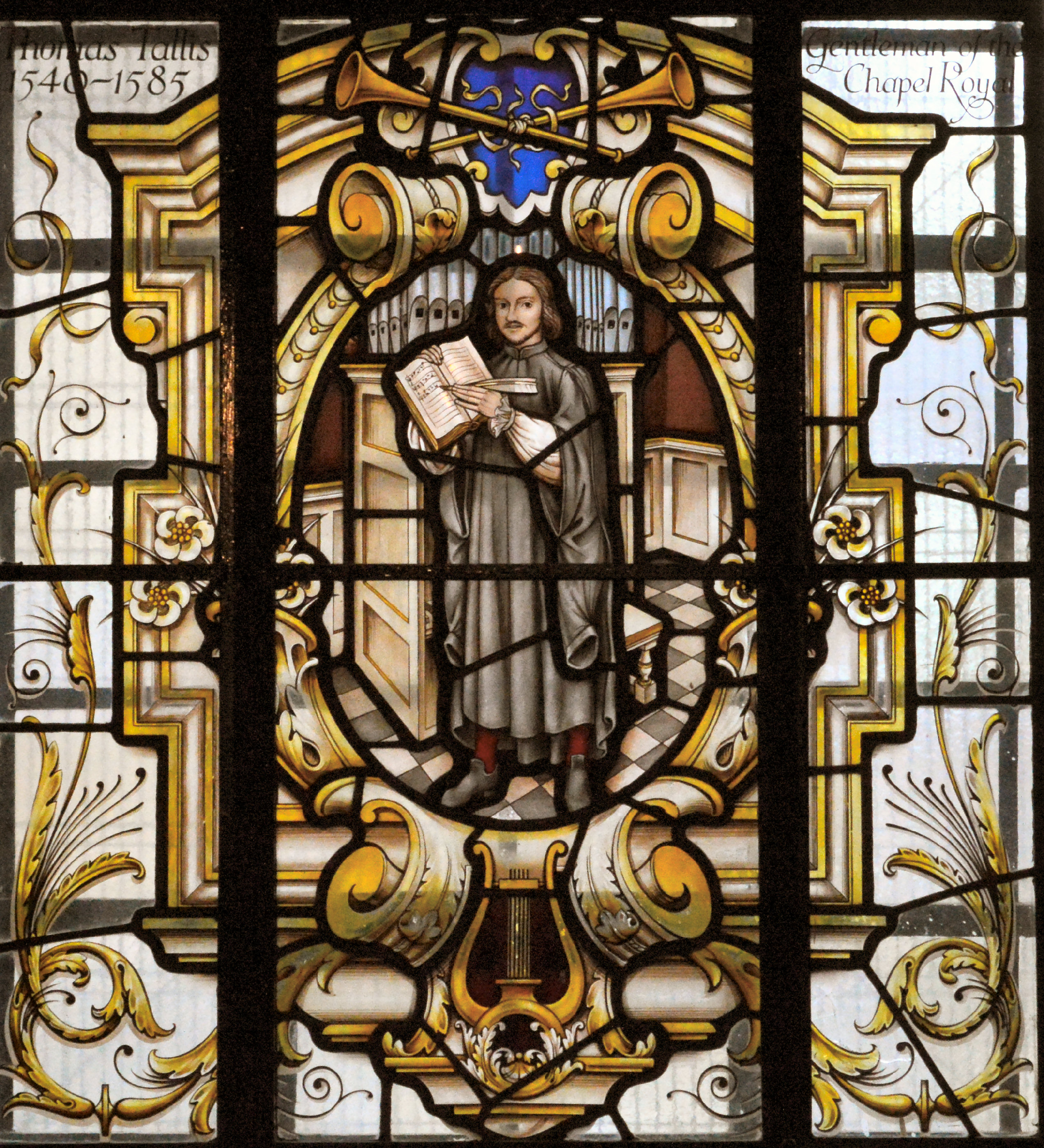
Thomas Tallis depicted in the Church

The church is dedicated to Alfege (also spelt "Alphege"), Archbishop of Canterbury, and reputedly marks the place where he was martyred on 19 April 1012, having been taken prisoner during the sack of Canterbury by Danish raiders the previous year. The Danes took him to their camp at Greenwich and killed him when the large ransom they demanded was not forthcoming.

The church was rebuilt in around 1290, and Henry VIII was baptized there in 1491.

The patronage of the church was given to the abbey at Ghent during the 13th century. Following the suppression of alien priories under Henry V, it was granted to the priory at Sheen with which it remained until transferred to the Crown by exchange under Henry VIII in 1530.

During a storm in 1710 the medieval church collapsed, its foundations having been weakened by burials both inside and outside.

== The present church ==
Following the collapse of the medieval church, the present building was constructed, funded by a grant from the Commission for Building Fifty New Churches, to the designs of Nicholas Hawksmoor, one of the commission's two surveyors. The first church to be built by the commissioners, it was begun in 1712 and basic construction was completed in 1714; it was not, however, consecrated until 1718. The church was built by Edward Strong the Younger a friend of Christopher Wren the Younger.

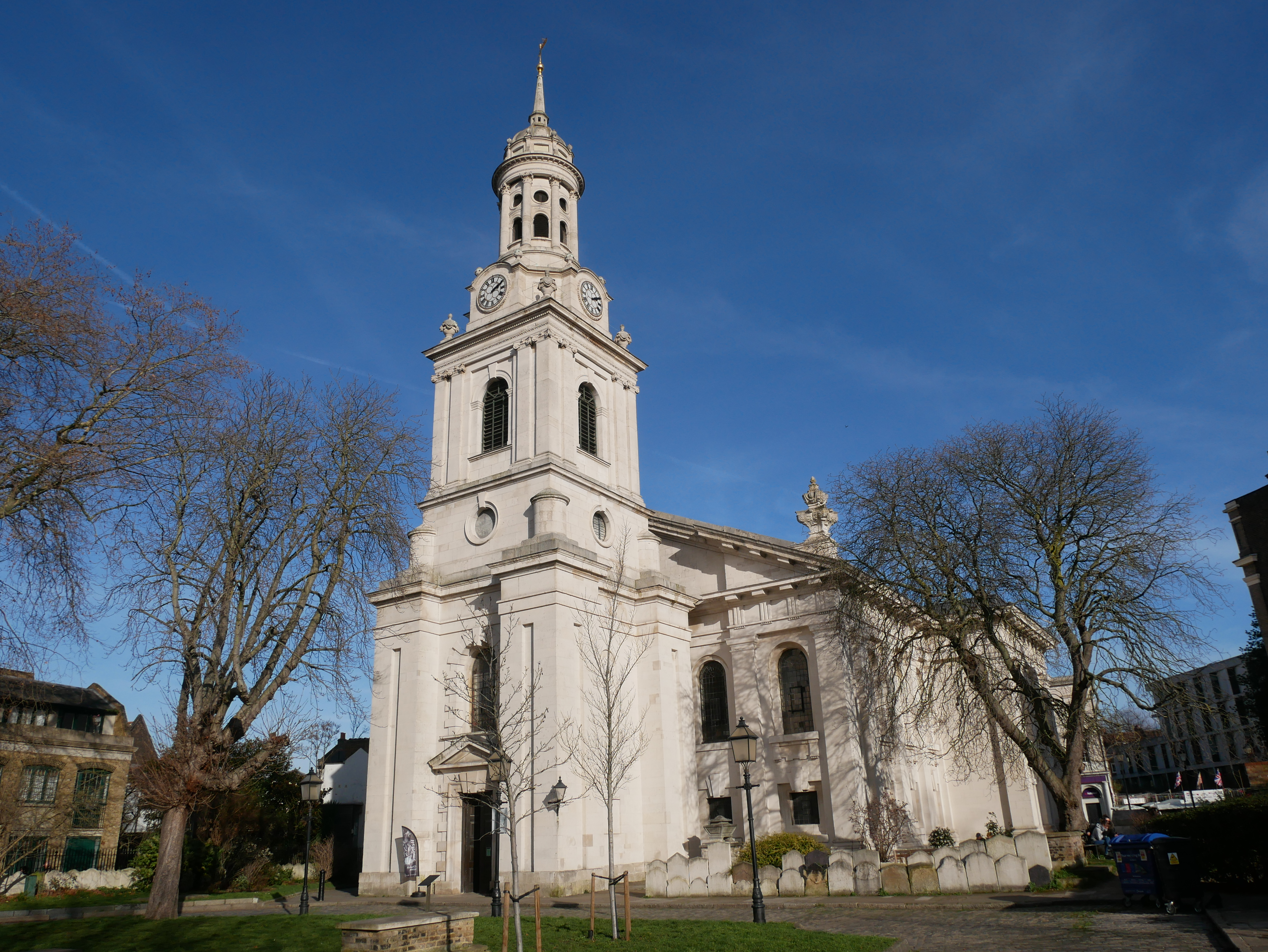
A view of the church from the southwest

The church is rectangular in plan with a flat ceiling and a small apse serving as a chancel. The east front, towards the street, has a portico in the Tuscan order, with a central arch cutting through the entablature and pediment—a motif used in Wren's "Great Model" for St Paul's Cathedral. A giant order of pilasters runs around the rest of the church, a feature Kerry Downes suggests may have been added by Thomas Archer, who, according to the minutes of the commission, "improved" Hawksmoor's plans. On the north and south sides of the churchwide projecting vestibules rise to the full height of the building, with steps leading up to the doors.

Hawksmoor planned a west tower, in the position of the existing one, which had survived the collapse. However the commission was reluctant to fund it, and the medieval tower was retained. In 1730 John James refaced it, and added a spire. Hawksmoor's design, published in an engraving in 1714, had an octagonal lantern at the top, a motif he was later to use at St George in the East.

The crypt served as an air-raid shelter during World War II. During the Blitz on 19 March 1941, incendiary bombs landed on the roof causing it to collapse, burning into the nave. The walls and the tower remained standing but much of the interior was gutted. The church was restored by Sir Albert Richardson in 1953. As part of the post-war restorations, stencils of Mary the Mother of Jesus and St John the Evangelist were installed either side of the Cross (forming a traditional rood) in the side chapel of St Alfege with St Peter by the tempera artist Augustus Lunn.

=== Organs ===
The present organ was installed in 2001, having been relocated from the Lower Chapel at Eton College, with some minor changes. It is an 1891 Lewis & Co instrument, with modifications in 1927 by A. Hunter & Son and 1970 by Harrison & Harrison.

Additionally, there is a small, six-stop moveable organ located in the north aisle, by W & A Boggis of Diss from c 1960, with a later restoration by Mander Organs.

==== Tallis organ ====
The previous organ had a long history. It dated from the 16th century (when St Alfege was recorded as having a pair of organs). The National Pipe Organ Register does not record its present whereabouts. However, a three manual drawstop console is on display at the West End of the South aisle. This may incorporate keys from the time of the composer Thomas Tallis, who was buried in the chancel of the medieval church in the 16th century. The organ was restored in 1706 by Thomas Swarbrick, with further restorations and modifications by Dallam (1765), George England (1770) and J. W. Walker & Sons Ltd (1840, 1853 and 1863). It was further restored and rebuilt in 1875 by the organ-builder Joseph Robson and Benjamin Flight, modified by Lewis & Co in 1910 and rebuilt by R. Spurden Rutt & Co in 1934. By this point it had grown to 47 stops. It survived the bomb damage of 1941 and was rebuilt, again by R Spurden Rutt, in 1953, with 55 stops.

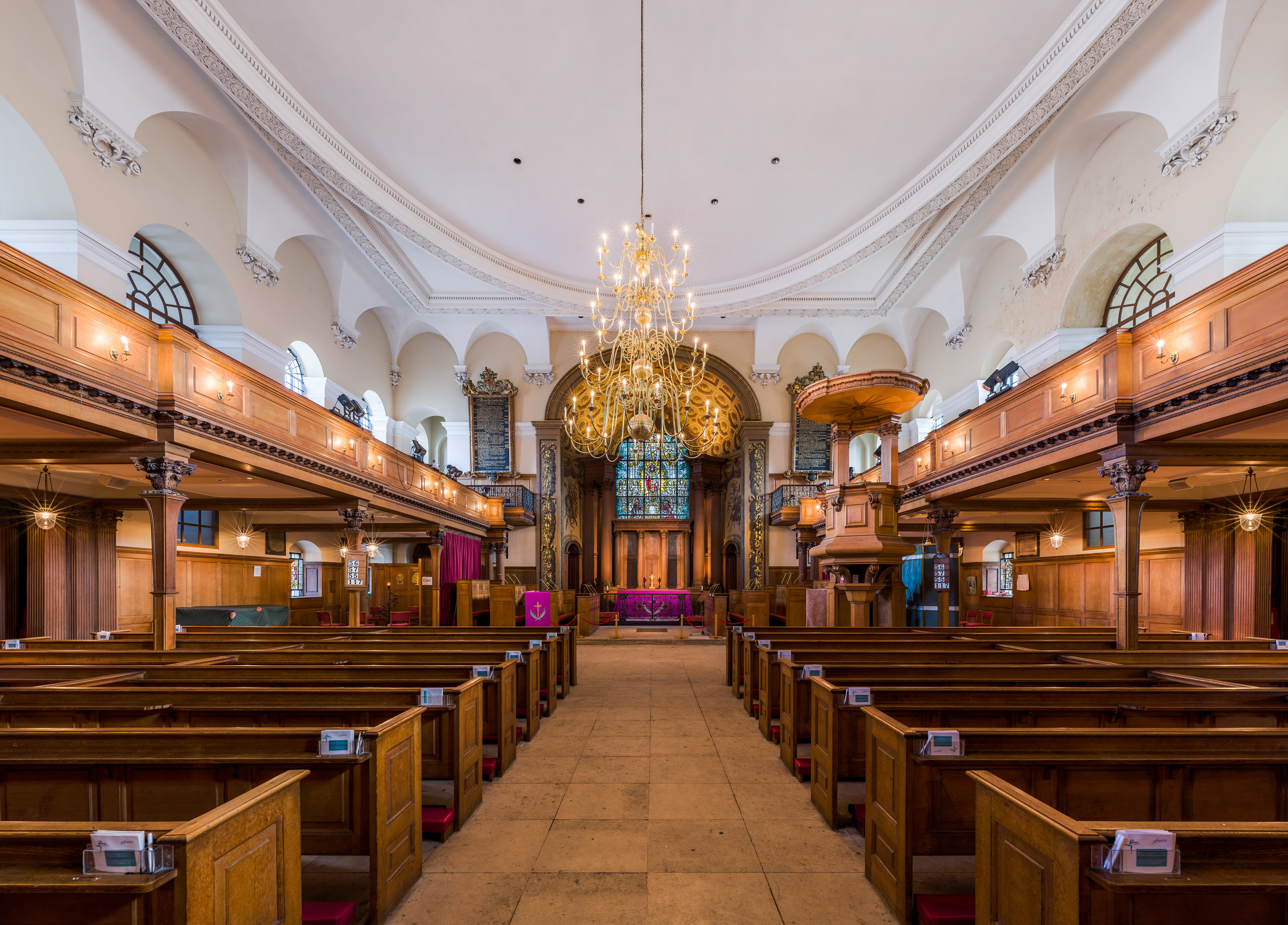
Interior view

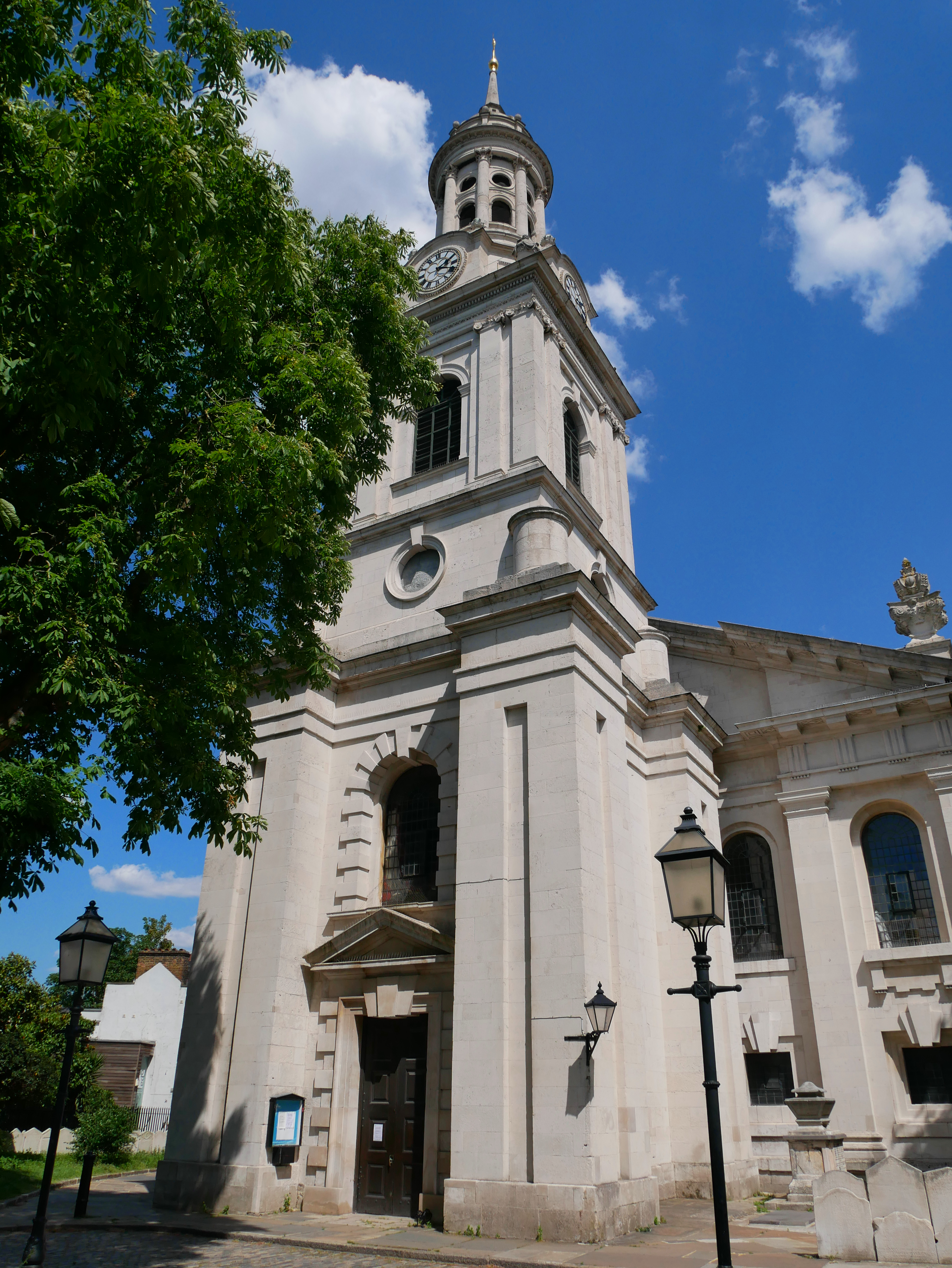
The tower on the west of the church

The church is currently used to celebrate "Founder's Day" of Addey and Stanhope School and The John Roan School.

=== Churchyards ===
The church had two churchyards, which were closed to burials in 1853. In 1889 they were transferred to the Greenwich District Board of Works. The later of the two churchyards was laid out as a garden and recreation ground by the landscape gardener Fanny Wilkinson, and opened in 1889. It was renamed St Alfege Park. Wilkinson planted 500 trees.

In 2015 a fund-raising cream tea garden party for Christian Aid, held in the churchyard after the Sunday sermon, was stormed by armed police. An attendee said that the vicar's wife was "almost knocked over by a policeman with a huge machine gun”, but "people just carried on drinking their tea" in a display of typical British fortitude even though "all these armed police bursting in was like the film Hot Fuzz”. The police proceeded to the adjacent St Alfege Park, where a man was arrested and a firearm found.

== Notable burials ==
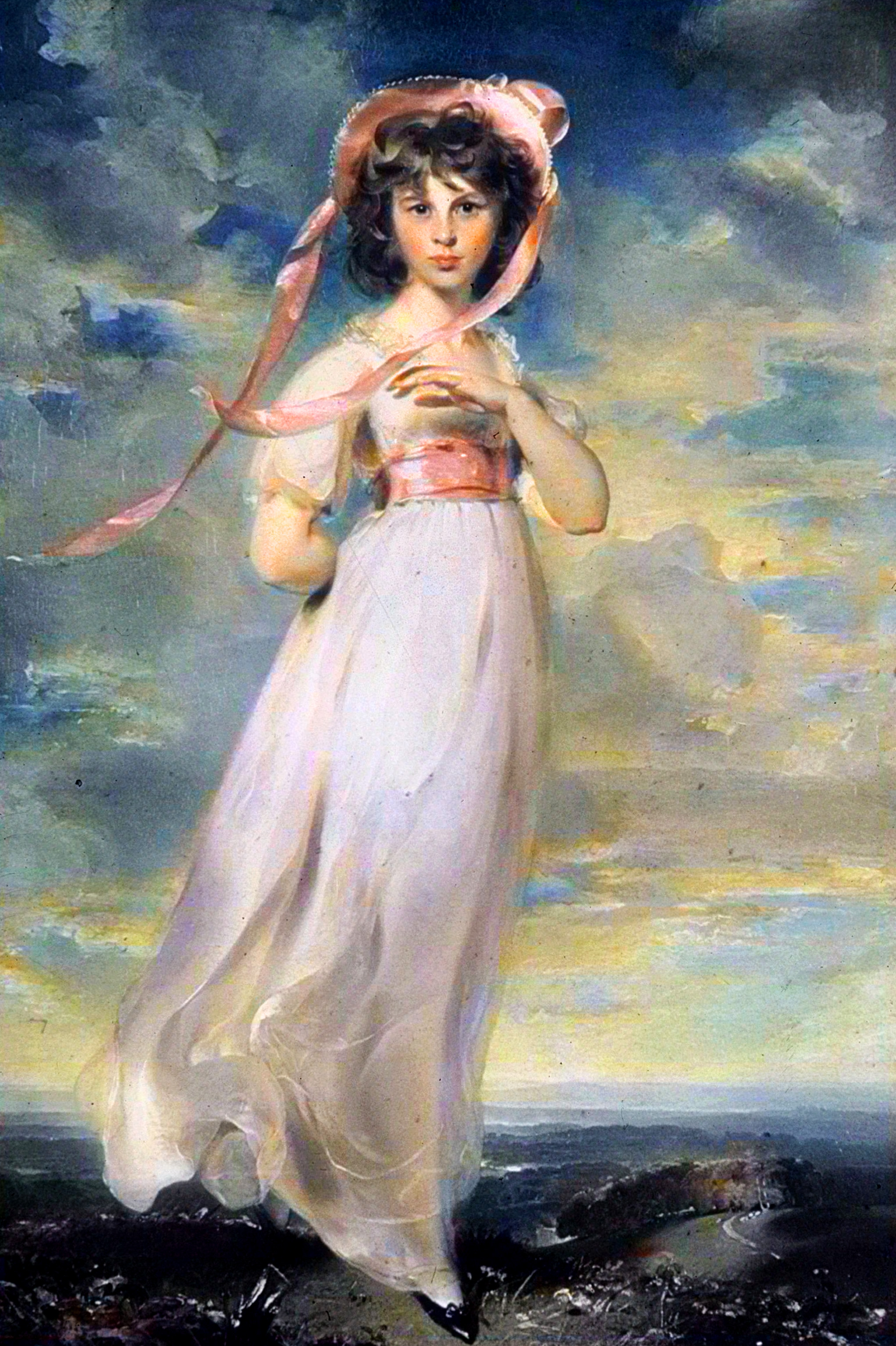
Sarah Barrett Moulton in the portrait Pinkie by Thomas Lawrence. Huntington Library, California.

Notable people buried in and around the church include the Renaissance choirmaster and composer William Newark (died 1509, no surviving memorial), Richard Bower (died 1561), Master of the Children of the Chapel Royal 1545–1561, the composer Thomas Tallis (died 1585), the courtier Elizabeth Roper (died 1658), the merchant Sir John Lethieullier (died 1719) on the outer south-west corner of the church, the English-born explorer of Canada Henry Kelsey (died 1724), General James Wolfe, the victor over the French in Canada but who died in the process at the Battle of the Plains of Abraham in 1759, the actress Lavinia Fenton (died 1760), and the MP Sir James Creed (died 1762), against the outer north wall.

Sarah Barrett Moulton, the Jamaican-born schoolgirl (1783–1795) who was the subject of the celebrated painting Pinkie, was buried in the church after dying aged twelve, just a year after her portrait had been painted. The merchant, Lloyd's underwriter and art collector John Julius Angerstein (died 1823), who was a churchwarden in the early 19th century, is also buried here.

== Literary connection ==
In Charles Dickens's novel Our Mutual Friend, Bella Wilfer marries John Rokesmith in St Alfege Church.

In Tom McCarthy's novel C, after a Marinettiesque car crash, Serge Carrefax laughs from his position within the upturned chassis. This laughter is "a pleasant noise; reminds him of liturgical chants and whispers echoing around St. Alfege's interior."

== See also ==
- List of churches and cathedrals of London
