= William Crane (musician) =

Royal choirmaster of the Tudor period

William Crane (died 1545) was Master of the Children of the Chapel Royal from 1523 to 1545, under Henry VIII.

The King bestowed several favourable appointments on Crane throughout his life by which he became a wealthy man, apparently through involvement in maritime trade. In 1509, already having been a Gentleman of the Chapel since about 1506, he was appointed Water-Bailiff of Dartmouth. In 1514 he was appointed Comptroller of the Petty Customs in the Port of London. In 1535 he was made Water-Bailiff of Lynn.

Crane married a woman named Margaret and they are known to have had a daughter. He fell ill in June 1545 and died shortly afterwards. He was buried in St Helen's Church, Bishopsgate.
