= Thomas Causton =

English composer

Thomas Causton or Caustun (died 1569) was an English composer.

Causton was a gentleman of the chapel royal under Edward VI, Mary I, and Elizabeth I. Nothing is known of his parentage, but it is possible that he is identical with a Thomas Causton who was living about the same date at Oxted in Surrey. This individual was the son of William Causton of Orpington, by Katherine Banister, and was married to Agnes Polley of Shoreham. Their son William (d. 1638) had a numerous family, who lived at Oxted until late in the seventeenth century. On 29 Oct. 1558 Mary wrote to the mayor and aldermen of London in favour of Thomas Causton, ‘one of the gentlemen of the chappell,’ requesting that he should be admitted into the freedom of the city. In 1560 he contributed some music to John Day's rare ‘Certain Notes, set forth in four and three parts, to be sung at the Morning, Communion, and Evening Prayer.’ The same publisher's ‘Whole Psalmes in Foure Partes’ (1563) also contains twenty-seven compositions by Causton. A Venite and service by him have been reprinted in the ‘Ecclesiologist,’ and a Te Deum and Benedictus in score are preserved in the British Library (Add MS 31226). He died on 28 Oct. 1569, and was succeeded at the Chapel Royal by Richard Farrant.

Modern scholars believe Causton was only included in John Day's collection because of his personal connection to the publisher. He was described as "earnest but amaterish" by Gustave Reese and as "As a composer [...] no more than an enthusiastic amateur" by Edmund Fellowes. Day published every piece by Causton, with the exception of his Yield unto God, but no posthumous volume as would be expected of a significant composer. This has been taken by scholars to show that Causton worked for Day as a script corrector or compiler.

He is not the same as the Thomas Causton reported by Foxe as having been put to death in 1555.

== Recordings ==
- Yield unto God the mighty Lord The Brabant Ensemble, Stephen Rice (conductor)
- Music from the Chirk Castle Part-Books The Brabant Ensemble, Stephen Rice (conductor)
- Turn thous us, O good Lord on Philip van Wilder: Complete Sacred Music & Chansons Cantores Chamber Choir, David Allinson (conductor)
