= Chick Evans (disambiguation) =

Chick Evans (1890–1915) was an American amateur golfer.

Chick Evans may also refer to:

- Chick Evans (baseball) (1889–1916), Major League pitcher (born Charles Franklin Evans)
- Chick Evans (coach) (1901–1976), Northern Illinois University football and basketball coach
- Charles Evans Jr. (born 1963), American film producer

== See also ==
- Charles Evans (disambiguation)
