= Thomas Palfreyman =

English author and musician

Thomas Palfreyman (d. 1589/90) was an English author and musician.

== Life ==
He was a gentleman of the chapel royal in Edward VI's reign, together with Thomas Tallis, Richard Farrant, William Hunnis, and others. He continued in office till 1589, apparently the year of his death. John Parkhurst, the bishop of Norwich, addressed an epigram to Palfreyman and Robert Couch jointly, and complimented them on their proficiency in music and theology.

Palfreyman made his will on 1 December 1589. he left small sums to his son Richard, and to Richard's children Thomas and Anne. The will was proved by his wife Mary on 30 May 1590.

== Works ==
The following works, all religious, are assigned to him:

- ‘An Exhortation to Knowledge and Love of God,’ London, 1560.
- ‘Tho. Palfreyman his Paraphrase on the Romans; also certain little tracts of Mart. Cellarius,’ London, no date; as well as tracts by Martin Cellarius this contained a letter of Huldrych Zwingli.
- ‘Divine Meditations,’ London, by Henry Bynneman for William Norton, 1572; dedicated to Isabel Harington, a gentlewoman of the Queen's privy chamber.
- ‘The Treatise of Heauenly Philosophie: conteyning therein not onely the most pithie sentences of God's sacred Scriptures, but also the sayings of certaine Auncient and Holie Fathers, London, by William Norton, 1578;’ a quarto of nine hundred pages, dedicated to Thomas Radclyffe, 3rd Earl of Sussex.

In 1567 Palfreyman revised and re-edited ‘A Treatise of Morall Philosophy, containynge the sayinges of the wyse,’ which William Baldwin had first published in 1547. Palfreyman's version of 1567 is described as ‘nowe once again augmented and the third tyme enlarged.’ It was published by Richard Tottell on 1 July 1567, and was dedicated to Henry Hastings, 3rd Earl of Huntingdon. It was a popular book, and new editions appeared in 1575, 1584, 1587, 1591, 1596, 1610, 1620, and 1630.

== Notes ==
Attribution

This article incorporates text from a publication now in the public domain: "Palfreyman, Thomas". Dictionary of National Biography. London: Smith, Elder & Co. 1885–1900.
