= Charlie Evans =

Charlie or Charley Evans may refer to:

- Charley Evans (fl. 1921), American baseball player
- Charlie Evans (Australian footballer) (1942–2021), Australian footballer
- Charlie Evans (American football) (1948–2024), American football player
- Charlotte Jordan (a.k.a. "Charlie Evans", born 1994), English actress
- Charlie Evans (actor) (born 2004), Australian actor

== See also ==
- Charles Evans (disambiguation)
