= Robert White (composer) =

English composer of liturgical music

- Born: c. 1538; Probably Holborn, England
- Died: Buried 11 November 1574 (aged 36)

Robert White (also Whyte; c. 1538 – 1574) probably born in Holborn, a district of London, was an English composer of High Renaissance music. His surviving works include a setting of verses from Lamentations, and instrumental music for viols.

== Life ==
Robert White was the son of an organ builder. He was a chorister, then a singing man, in the choir of Trinity College, Cambridge from 1554 to 1562. During that time, in 1560, he received a Bachelorship of Music from Cambridge University, and in 1562 he moved the few miles to Ely, where he succeeded his father-in-law Christopher Tye as Master of the Choristers and married Christopher Tye's daughter in 1565.

He accepted a similar post at Chester Cathedral in 1566, where he succeeded Richard Saywell and took part in the Chester Whitsuntide pageants during the years 1567 to 1569. Such was his reputation as a choir trainer that in 1570 he was appointed organist and master of the choristers of Westminster Abbey.

White and his family died in an outbreak of plague in the Westminster, 1574. Although White seems to have spent much of his life working to the north of the capital, his will (dated 7 November 1574) stated that he left property of some substance in Sussex and directed that he be buried in St. Margaret's, Westminster "nere unto my children". White was buried on 11 November 1574 aged around 36.

== Music ==
Fortunately quite a large number of White's compositions have survived, several of which were included in the Dow Partbooks. His surviving 17 Latin motets, one Latin Magnificat, two sets of the Lamentations, and eight anthems are all sufficient to place him in the front rank of English composers of the Elizabethan age. His surviving non-choral works include In nomine for viols and his hexachord fantasia for keyboard.

Many of the motets are settings of the Psalms, characterized by continuous points of imitation, with the beginnings of each phrase set syllabically. His set of Lamentations for five voices has a flavour in advance of his period, as also his Regina Coeli.

White's works fall into two main groups: those that could have been used in Sarum services and devotions under Mary, and those (psalm-motets and Lamentations) that were probably written in Elizabeth's reign.

The Sarum works comprise antiphons, hymns and a respond, all on equal-note cantus firmi, and a large-scale six-part Magnificat that, like two of Taverner's settings, has a psalm tone as the tenor of the full-choir sections. The Magnificat bears the date 1570 in the fragmentary source in the Bodleian Library, but the style makes it very much easier to take this as the year of copying than as the year of composition. For example, at Sicut locutus, a four-part section with the plainsong in the mean, mostly in longs and breves, the accompanying parts have numerous crotchet runs, which, although considerably more numerous and more hectic, give something of the same effect as the similarly scored Et incarnatus of Taverner's mass Gloria tibi Trinitas. But there are also traces of the repetitive techniques characteristic of White in his full-choir motets. The key point here is the exchanging of material between pairs of voices of equal range throughout a four-part or six-part texture. Tallis and his contemporary, the composer John Sheppard, reversed a single pair of (countertenor) parts when the music for one verse of a hymn was re-used, or very occasionally when a set of entries was re-stated.

White left four settings of the Compline hymn Christe qui lux es et dies. Its text, an evening prayer for peaceful rest, full of imagery of light and darkness, seems to have held special appeal for White. The setting now numbered as I is in five-part homophony. The others follow the established pattern of alternating plainchant verses with polyphonic ones that incorporate the chant, in this instance in the tenor part.

== Works ==
- Ad te levavi oculos meos
- Appropinquet deprecatio mea
- Christe qui lux es I, II, III & IV
- Deus, misereatur nostri 6vv
- Domine quis habitabit I, II, III
- Exaudiat te Dominus 5vv with gymels
- Fantasias III & IV
- In Nomine V a 5
- Justus es, Domine
- Lamentations 5vv
- Lamentations 6vv
- Libera me, Domine de morte aeterna 4vv
- The Lord Bless Us and Keep Us
- Lord, who shall dwell
- Miserere mei, Deus 5vv
- Magnificat 6vv
- Manus Tuae Fecerunt Me
- Mr White his song
- Mr White's Trumpet Tune
- O Praise God
- Portio mea
- Regina caeli 5vv
- Six Organ Fantasias
- Tota pulchra es

== Legacy ==
Thomas Morley, in his A Plaine and Easie Introduction to Practicall Musicke (1597) extols him as one of the greatest English composers, equal to Orlando di Lasso. He notes White's bold harmonies, and includes him in a list of seven eminent Tudor composers that includes "Fayrfax, Taverner, Sheppard, Whyte, Parsons and Mr Byrd." Some MS partbooks now at Christ Church, Oxford dated about 1581 contain the tribute "Maxima musarum nostrarum gloria White' Tu peris, aeternum sed tua musa manet" ("Thou, O White, greatest glory of our muses, dost perish, but thy muse endureth for ever").

Though Robert White stood so high among mid-sixteenth century musicians, his compositions were almost utterly neglected till unearthed by Charles Burney.

White's Lamentations and Miserere were sung by the choir of Chester Cathedral for the 450th anniversary of his death during Passiontide, 2024.
