= Dow Partbooks =

Sheet music collection

The Dow Partbooks (Christ Church, Mus. MSS 984–988) are a collection of five partbooks compiled by Robert Dow in Oxford around 1581–88. The collection includes mostly choral but also some instrumental pieces. At the end is an instrumental La gamba and a canon, both a 3 and apparently copied from Vincenzo Ruffo's book printed in Milan in 1564.

The partbooks are an important source for Tudor music, and the sole known source for some of the pieces. Robert Dow was a trained calligrapher and the books are unusually easy to read among manuscripts of the Tudor period. All works were copied by him, with the exception of numbers 53–4, which were copied by John Baldwin (a singing-man at St George's Chapel), and nos. 99–100, which were copied by an unidentified person. The numberings following no. 54 were added by several other people at a later time (19th century), in sequences that do not coincide perfectly.

The collection was acquired by Henry Aldrich and donated to Christ Church, Oxford as part of his bequest to the college following his death in 1710.

== Contents ==
No.	Title	Composer	Comments
1.	Lamentations. Heth. Peccatum peccavit	Robert White	(Heth, Teth, Iod, Caph, Lamed, Mem)
2.	Miserere mei Deus	Robert White	
3.	Christe qui lux es et dies, I	Robert White	
4.	Christe qui lux es et dies, II	Robert White	
5.	Christe qui lux es et dies, III	Robert White	
6.	Manus tuae fecerunt me	Robert White	
7.	Portio mea, Domine	Robert White	
8.	Justus es, Domine	Robert White	
9a.	Ne irascaris, Domine	William Byrd	
9b.	Civitas sancti tui	William Byrd	Part 2 of no. 9
10.	O Domine, adjuva me	William Byrd	
11a.	Tribulationes civitatum	William Byrd	
11b.	Timor et hebetudo	William Byrd	Part 2 of no. 11
11c.	Nos enim pro peccatis	William Byrd	Part 3 of no. 11
12.	Domine, exaudi orationem	William Byrd	
13.	Domine, praestolamur	William Byrd	
14.	Ad te clamamus	Christopher Tye	
15.	Omnes gentes, plaudite manibus	Christopher Tye	
16.	Esurientes implevit bonis	John Sheppard	
17.	Angelus ad pastores ait	Orlando di Lasso	
18.	Veni in hortum meum	Orlando di Lasso	
19.	O salutaris hostia	Thomas Tallis	
20.	Salvator mundi, I	Thomas Tallis	
21.	Candidi facti sunt	Thomas Tallis	
22.	Dum transisset Sabbatum	Robert Johnson	
23.	Exaudiat te, Dominus	Robert White	
24.	Tribulationem et dolorem inveni	Alfonso Ferrabosco	
25.	Non me vincat, Deus meus	Nicholas Strogers	
26.	Dum transisset Sabbatum, I	John Taverner	
27a.	Tribulatio proxima est	William Byrd	
27b.	Contumelias et terrores	William Byrd	Part 2 of no. 27
28.	Appropinquet deprecatio mea	Robert White	
29.	Christus resurgens	John Tailer	
30a.	O quam gloriosum est regnum	William Byrd	
30b.	Benedictio et claritas	William Byrd	Part 2 of no. 30
31a.	Tristitia et anxietas	William Byrd	
31b.	Sed tu, Domine	William Byrd	Part 2 of no. 31
32.	Apparebit in finem	William Byrd	
33.	Audivi vocem de caelo	William Byrd	
34.	In resurrectione tua	William Byrd	
35.	Retribue servo tuo	Robert Parsons	
36.	Fac cum servo tuo	William Byrd	
37.	Sive vigilem	William Mundy	
38.	Christe qui lux es et dies, IV	Robert White	
39a.	Deus venerunt gentes	William Byrd	
39b.	Posuerunt morticinia	William Byrd	Part 2 of no. 39
40.	Domine, tu jurasti	William Byrd	
41.	Exsurge, quare obdormis	William Byrd	
42.	O sacrum convivium	Thomas Tallis	
43.	Salvator mundi, II	Thomas Tallis	
44.	Effuderunt sanguinem	William Byrd	Part 3 of no. 39
45.	Christe qui lux es et dies	William Byrd	
46.	Laetentur caeli	William Byrd	
47.	Facti sumus opprobrium	William Byrd	Part 4 of no. 39
48.	Ave Maria	Robert Parsons	
49.	Dum transisset Sabbatum	Roose	
50.	Decantabat populus	Anonymous	
51.	Mirabile mysterium	Alfonso Ferrabosco	
52.	Miserere mei, Deus	William Byrd	
53.	O bone Jesu	Robert Parsons	
54.	Vestigia mea dirige	Nathaniel Giles	
55.	Lord, who shall dwell	Robert White	
56.	The Lord bless us and keep us	Robert White	
57.	O Lord, make thy servant Elizabeth	William Byrd	
58.	Prevent us, O Lord	William Byrd	
59.	How long shall mine enemies	William Byrd	
60.	O that most rare breast	William Byrd	
61.	For thee both kings	William Byrd	Part 2 of no. 60
62.	The doleful debt	William Byrd	Part 3 of no. 60
63.	Come to me, grief, for ever	William Byrd	
64.	In fields abroad	William Byrd	
65.	Where fancy fond	William Byrd	
66.	Susanna fair	William Byrd	(1588)
67.	While Phoebus used to dwell	William Byrd	
68.	Why do I use my paper, ink and pen?	William Byrd	
69.	La virginella	William Byrd	
70.	I joy not in no earthly bliss	William Byrd	
71.	Ah, golden hairs	William Byrd	
72.	Lord, in thy wrath reprove me not	William Byrd	
73.	Care for thy soul	William Byrd	
74.	Browning	William Byrd	(instrumental)
75.	Browning	Clement Woodcock	(instrumental)
76.	Miserere	Mallorie	(instrumental)
77.	Ascendo ad Patrem	Jean Maillard	attrib. Tye in MS
78.	Rubem quem	Christopher Tye	(instrumental)
79.	Susanne un jour	Orlando di Lasso	
80.	Madonna somm'accorto	Giacomo Fogliano	attrib. Tye in MS
81.	Pour vous aymer	Philippe van Wilder	
82.	De la court	Robert Parsons	(instrumental)
83.	De la court	Robert Parsons	(instrumental), Part 2 of no. 82
84.	Je fille quand Dieu	Philippe van Wilder	
85.	In nomine	Robert Parsons	(instrumental)
86.	In nomine, V	William Byrd	(instrumental)
87.	In nomine, I	Nicholas Strogers	(instrumental)
88.	In nomine, III	Nicholas Strogers	(instrumental)
89.	In nomine, II	Nicholas Strogers	(instrumental)
90.	In nomine	John Bull	(instrumental)
91.	In nomine	Robert White	(instrumental)
92.	In nomine "Follow me"	Christopher Tye	(instrumental)
93.	In nomine, I	Clement Woodcock	(instrumental)
94.	If that a sinner's sighs	William Byrd	
95.	If women could be fair	William Byrd	
96.	Prostrate, O Lord, I lie	William Byrd	
97.	Even from the depth unto the Lord	William Byrd	
98.	When I was otherwise than now I am	William Byrd	
99.	In nomine, I	Brewster	(instrumental)
100.	O God, wherefore art thou absent	Anonymous	
101.	When I look back	Robert Parsons	in Tenor partbook only (Mus. 986)
102.	Come Holy Ghost / In nomine	Anonymous	
103.	O Lord of whom I do depend / In nomine	Anonymous	
104.	O Lord, turn not away thy face / In nomine	Anonymous	
105.	When May is in his prime	Anonymous	
106.	May makes the cheerful hive	Anonymous	Part 2 of no. 105
107.	All ye that live on earth	Anonymous	Part 3 of no. 105
108.	Ah, alas, you salt sea gods	Richard Farrant	
109.	You gods that guide	Richard Farrant	Part 2 of no. 108
110.	A doleful deadly pang	Nicholas Strogers	
111.	My little sweet darling	Anonymous	
112.	Ah, silly poor Joas	Anonymous	
113.	In terrors trapped	Anonymous	
114.	The saint I serve	Anonymous	
115.	How can the tree but waste	Anonymous	
116.	Alas, alack, my heart is woe	Anonymous	
117.	Lulla, lullaby, my sweet little baby	William Byrd	(Refrain)
118.	Be still, my blessed babe	William Byrd	(Verse)
119.	O Lord, how vain	William Byrd	
120.	My mind to me a kingdom is	William Byrd	
121.	Who likes to love	William Byrd	
122.	Enforced by love	Robert Parsons	
123.	Mistrust not truth	Anonymous	
124.	The day delayed	Anonymous	
125.	Come tread the paths	Anonymous	
126.	Farewell, my lords	Anonymous	Part 2 of no. 125
127.	Triumph with pleasant melody	William Byrd	
128.	What unacquainted cheerful voice	William Byrd	Part 2 of no. 127
129.	My faults, O Christ	William Byrd	Part 3 of no. 127
130.	Blessed is he that fears the Lord	William Byrd	
131.	Blame I confess	William Byrd	
132.	O Lord, within thy tabernacle	William Byrd	
133.	How shall a young man	William Byrd	
134.	Though Amaryllis dance in green	William Byrd	
135.	La gamba	Vincenzo Ruffo	(instrumental, Mss. 984-6 only) attrib. "Francesco Mocheni" in MS.
136.	Trinitas in unitate	Vincenzo Ruffo	in Tenor partbook only (Ms. 987)
137.	Hey down, sing ye now after me	Anonymous	in Bassus partbook only (Ms. 988)

- N.B. pieces are numbered sequentially in the table above, rather than following the numbering of the MS, which contains some errors and is inconsistent between the partbooks.

== Bibliography ==
- The Dow Partbooks, Oxford, Christ Church Mus. 984-988: facsimile with introduction by John Milsom (Oxford: DIAMM Publications, 2010)
- D. Mateer: Oxford, Christ Church Music MSS 984–8; an Index and Commentary, RMARC, no.20 (1986–7), 1–18
