= Tessa Beaver =

British printmaker, painter, and illustrator (1932–2018)

- Born: Theresa Courtenay Theobald; 30 March 1932; Hampstead, London, England
- Died: 9 May 2018 (aged 86); Leamington Spa, Warwickshire, England
- Education: Slade School of Art
- Spouse: Harold Beaver (m. 1957)

Theresa Courtenay "Tessa" Beaver (née Theobald; 30 March 1932 – 9 May 2018) was a British printmaker, painter and illustrator.

== Early life ==
Beaver was born in Hampstead, London in 1932, the first of five children of Virginia (nee Virginia Maxwell Ayrton, daughter of Maxwell Ayrton) and Courtenay Theobald, the architect (Maxwell Ayrton's practice partner, as well as son-in-law).

The Ayrton family originated in Yorkshire, though Tessa Theobald descended from a branch long-resident in Cheshire. Her forebear Edward Ayrton was mayor of Ripon in 1760, and laid the foundations for the family's subsequent prominence.

Beaver studied at the Slade School of Art, achieving her Diploma in Fine Art in 1953. She studied etching for a year afterwards with John Buckland-Wright.

== Career ==
Her career began, under her birth name of Tessa Theobald, as an illustrator and designer of book jackets. She became the art editor of children's books at Oxford University Press and later at Thomas Nelson.

She is also known for her painting and etching.

Following her marriage to Harold Beaver, the couple took up a post in Kenya. There, she travelled extensively around the country, developing her knowledge of woodblock printing. On her return to UK, she taught printmaking at Mid-Warwickshire College.

In 1989 she was commissioned to create a set of prints to mark Birmingham's centenary.

In 2014 a large exhibition of her work at Leamington Spa Art Gallery & Museum was accompanied by major monograph on her work My Craft or Sullen Art (ISBN 1872940064). She exhibited at international exhibitions of printmaking in Brazil, China, Poland, Italy and Netherlands. Beaver's prints have been shown at the Society of Wood Engravers, the Royal Society of Painters, Etchers and Engravers, the Royal Academy Summer Exhibitions. She has held solo shows at the University of Warwick, the Lantern Gallery in Manchester, St. Michael's Gallery in Derby, the Quadrangle Gallery in Oxford and the Mignon Gallery in Bath.

She was a prize winner at the 5th Seoul International Print Biennale in South Korea.

== Personal life ==
She married Harold Beaver on 12 October 1957. She lived in Leamington Spa and died on 9 May 2018.
