= Samuel Thomas Champnes =

Samuel Thomas Champnes (died 1803) was the first person to sing "Heart of Oak" in Harlequin's Invasion at the Garrick Theatre in Drury lane. A former Westminster Chorister, probably owing to his maternal grandfather being John Weldon an apprentice to Purcell and a Royal Organist at St George's Chapel. (This connection was made using John's will.) Champnes went on to be one of Handel's soloists.

According to Peter Ward Jones, music librarian of the Bodleian Library, "Champness had sung in Handel performances as a boy treble in the 1740s (according to the article on him in the Biographical Dictionary of Actors ), and Handel had apparently written several arias for the part of the young Benjamin in his oratorio Joseph and his Brethren for Champness in 1744, and he may well have sung in the choruses of Messiah as a boy."
