= Nathaniel Giles =

English composer and organist (1558–1633/4)

- Born: 1558
- Died: 1633 or 1634 (aged 75–77)
- Occupations: Organist; composer
- Era: Renaissance
- Notable work: Te Deum; Vestigia mea dirige
- Children: Nathaniel Giles

Nathaniel Giles (1558 – 1633 or 1634) was an English Renaissance organist and composer. He was the organist for Worcester Cathedral and wrote Anglican anthems.

While Master of the Children of the Chapel Royal, he took over Blackfriars Theatre in a business arrangement with producer Henry Evans and there he worked with Ben Jonson on a children's company. Giles had the power under a royal warrant to impress children for service in the Chapel Royal. He allowed Evans and others to use the warrant to legally abduct children not for service as choir boys, but to work in their theatre. When in 1600 they abducted the son of a nobleman, this led to the Clifton Star Chamber Case.

He was also a master of the Choir of St George's Chapel, Windsor Castle, and an organist at Westminster Abbey.

His Te Deum (Durham Cathedral manuscript A2, folio 56) has instructions for the organist to play an octave lower than written, and one assumes this is to give the "dark" sonority of a 10 feet (3.0 m) organ stop rather than the everyday colour of the standard 5 feet (1.5 m) principal stop of the Tudor organ. His Vestigia mea dirige was included in the manuscript collection known as the Dow Partbooks.

His son, Nathaniel Giles, became a Canon of Windsor.

Cultural offices
Preceded by William Hunnis	Master of the Children of the Chapel Royal; 1597-1633	Succeeded by Thomas Day
