= Robert Johnson (Scottish composer) =

Scottish composer and priest

Robert Johnson (c. 1470 – after 1554) was a Scottish Renaissance composer and priest.

Little is known of Johnson's early life, and it is believed much of his music has been lost. Most of his extant works are sacred compositions, chiefly motets. He also wrote some instrumental pieces. No secular works of his are known to have existed. Johnson spent 36 years at Scone Abbey in Perthshire, Scotland. He is widely considered Scotland's greatest composer prior to Robert Carver (c. 1485 – c. 1570). He is represented in The Mulliner Book as well as the Gyffard partbooks and Christ Church partbooks. The Dum transisset Sabbatum for 5 voices are in the Dow Partbooks.

== Musical compositions ==
- Domine In Virtute Tua I
- Domine In Virtute Tua II
- Dum Transisset Sabbatum for 4 voices
- Dum Transisset Sabbatum for 5 voices
- Gaude Maria Virgo
- Ave Dei Patris Filia
- Benedicam Domino
- Laudes Deo
- I Give You A New Commandment

== Recordings ==
Laudes Deo: Cappella Nova conducted by Alan Tavener (ASV Records)
