= Nathaniel Giles (priest) =

English priest

Nathaniel Giles (born 1591) was a Canon of Windsor from 1624 to 1644.

== Family ==
He was born in 1591, the son of Nathaniel Giles, master of the Choir of St George's Chapel, Windsor Castle.

== Career ==
He was appointed:

- Rector of Newbury, Berkshire 1619
- Rector of Newton Longueville, Buckinghamshire 1620
- Prebendary of Worcester 1627
- Rector of Chinnor, Oxford 1628 - 1644
- Rector of Sloley, Norfolk 1629
- Rector of Ruislip, 1648

He was appointed to the tenth stall in St George's Chapel, Windsor Castle in 1624 and held the canonry until 1644.
