= One Oak, Frognal =

Coordinates: 51.5568°N 0.1856°W

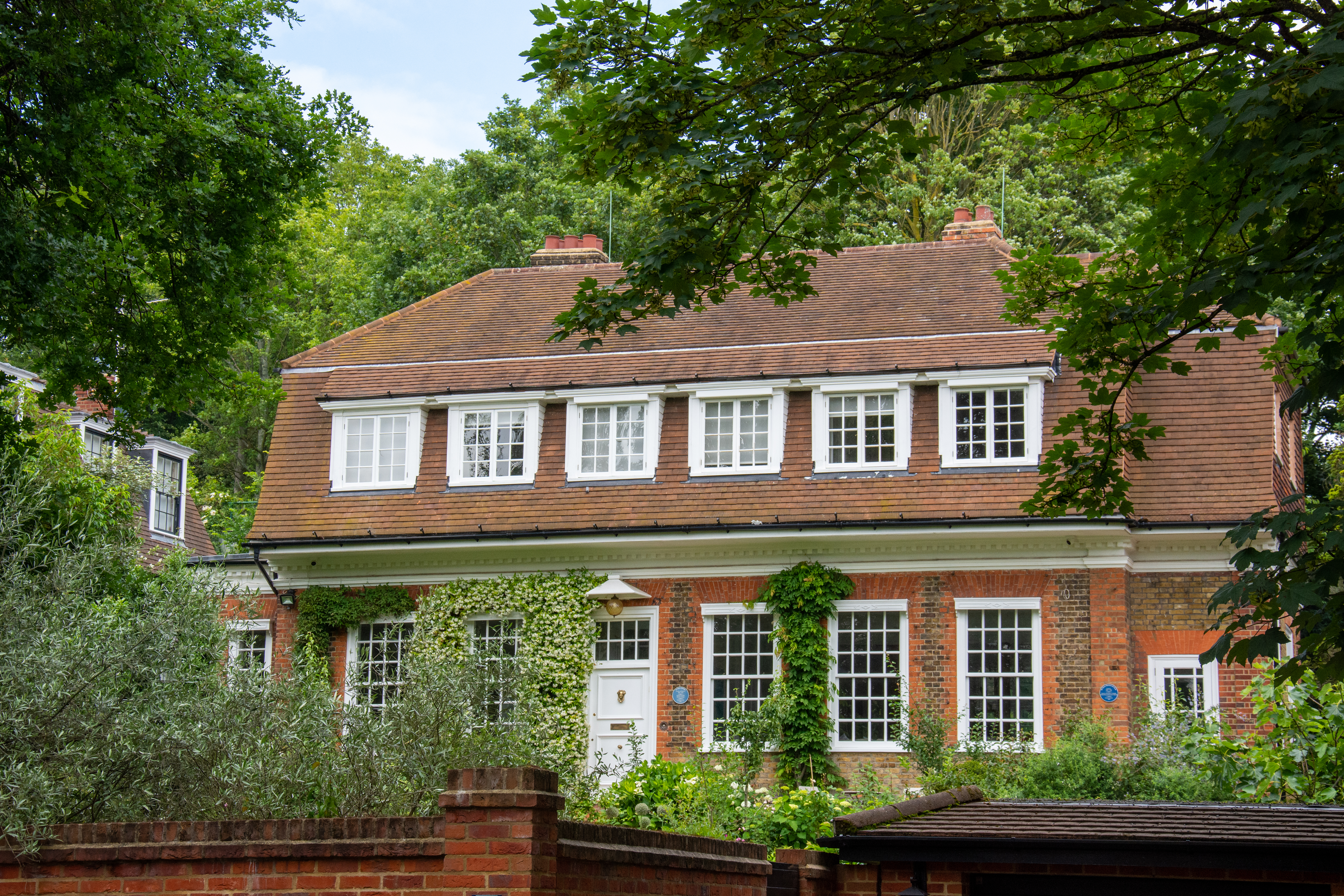
One Oak in 2021

One Oak at 16 Redington Road in the Frognal area of Hampstead, London NW3, is a detached house built in 1889 by the architect Arthur Heygate Mackmurdo. The house has been listed Grade II on the National Heritage List for England since January 1999.

The house was designed by Mackmurdo for a Mrs Geddes in 1889, it was subsequently occupied by the sculptor Hamo Thornycroft and by the engineer Owen Williams. A wing and separate studio were added to the house by Maxwell Ayrton in 1927 for Williams. The interior of the house contains many decorative features designed by Mackmurdo including decorated skirting boards, doorways, cornices and fireplaces. The house is ordered into six bays with tall sash windows, surmounted by a mansard roof.

Bridget Cherry, writing in the 1998 London: North edition of the Pevsner Architectural Guides, described the 'simplicity' of One Oak as 'forward looking for its date'.
