= Heart of Oak =

British patriotic military song

Heart of Oak
Heart of Oak, by Cecilian Male Quartet, Canada 1915

"Heart of Oak" is the official march of the Royal Navy. It is also the official march of several Commonwealth navies, including the Royal Canadian Navy and the Royal New Zealand Navy.

The music of 'Heart of Oak' was written in 1759 by composer William Boyce, and the lyrics by actor David Garrick, for Garrick's pantomime Harlequin's Invasion, to which others contributed as well. The pantomime was first performed on New Year's Eve of that year at the Theatre Royal, Drury Lane, London, with Handel soloist Samuel Thomas Champnes singing Heart of Oak.

The "wonderful year" referenced in the first verse was the Annus Mirabilis of 1759, during which British forces were victorious in several significant battles: the Battle of Minden on 1 August 1759; the Battle of Lagos on 19 August 1759; the Battle of the Plains of Abraham (outside Quebec City) on 13 September 1759; and the Battle of Quiberon Bay on 20 November 1759. The last battle foiled a French invasion project planned by the Duc de Choiseul to defeat Britain during the Seven Years' War, hence the reference in the song to 'flat-bottom' invasion barges. These victories were followed a few months later by the Battle of Wandiwash in India on 22 January 1760. Britain's continued success in the war boosted the song's popularity.

The oak in the song's title refers to the wood from which British warships were generally made during the Age of Sail. The "Heart of oak" is the strongest central wood of the tree. The reference to "freemen not slaves" echoes the refrain ("Britons never will be slaves!") of 'Rule, Britannia!', written and composed two decades earlier.

The first verse and chorus of this version of the song is heard in Star Trek: The Next Generation (Season 3, Episode 18 "Allegiance"), sung in Ten Forward by Patrick Stewart, in-character as an alien doppelgänger of Captain Jean-Luc Picard. Both are also sung by Peter Ustinov and Dean Jones in the 1968 Disney movie Blackbeard's Ghost.

In late 2024, the Royal Canadian Navy was mulling replacing 'Heart of Oak' with a new composition.

== Lyrics ==
=== Original ===
The song was written for the London stage in 1759 by William Boyce with words by David Garrick:

Come cheer up, my lads! 'tis to glory we steer,
To add something more to this wonderful year;
To honour we call you, as free men not slaves,
For who are so free as the sons of the waves?

Chorus:
Heart of oak are our ships, heart of oak are our men;
We always are ready, steady, boys, steady!
We'll fight and we'll conquer again and again.

=== Amended words ===
Come, cheer up, my lads, 'tis to glory we steer,
To add something new to this wonderful year;
To honour we call you, as freemen not slaves,
For who are so free as the sons of the waves?

Chorus:
Heart of Oak are our ships,
Jolly Tars are our men,
We always are ready: Steady, boys, Steady!
We'll fight and we'll conquer again and again.

We ne'er see our foes but we wish them to stay,
They never see us but they wish us away;
If they run, why we follow, and run them ashore,
For if they won't fight us, what can we do more?

(Chorus)

They say they'll invade us, these terrible foes,
They frighten our women, our children, our beaus,
But if they in their flat-bottoms, in darkness set oar,
Still Britons they'll find to receive them on shore.

(Chorus)

We still make them fear and we still make them flee,
And drub them ashore as we drub them at sea,
Then cheer up me lads with one heart let us sing,
Our soldiers and sailors, our statesmen and king.

(Chorus)

Alternative first verse:
Come, cheer up, my lads, 'tis to glory we steer,
With heads carried high, we will banish all fear;
To honour we call you, as freemen not slaves,
For who are so free as the sons of the waves?

Alternative last verse:
Britannia triumphant her ships rule the seas,
Her watchword is 'Justice' her password is 'Free',
So come cheer up my lads, with one heart let us sing,
Our soldiers, our sailors, our statesmen, our King [Queen].

=== Royal Canadian Navy ===
Come, cheer up, my lads, 'tis to glory we steer,
To add something new to this wonderful year;
To honour we call you, not press you like slaves,
For who are so free as the sons of the waves?

Chorus:
Heart of Oak are our ships,
Jolly Tars are our men,
We always are ready: Steady, boys, steady!
We'll fight and we'll conquer again and again.

=== French lyrics (Royal Canadian Sea Cadets) ===
Debout mes gaillards, pointons-nous vers la gloire,
Fleurons ajoutons à ces heures sans déboire (Note: Some cadet units use instead "Fleurons ajoutons à cet an sans déboire".)
Sans carcans et sans joug,
Tout l'honneur nous attend,
Pour nous qui sommes les fils libres de l'océan.

Coeur de chêne nos navires
Gais lurons nos marins
Toujours fidèles au poste,
Hardis, gars, hardis!
L'avenir est à nous les vrais!

Coeur de chêne nos navires,
Gais lurons nos marins,
Toujours fidèles au poste,
Hardis, gars, hardis!
L'avenir est à nous les vrais conquérants!

=== New lyrics ===
A new version was presented on 16 April 1809 and published by Reverend Rylance.

When Alfred, our King, drove the Dane from this land,
He planted an oak with his own royal hand;
And he pray'd for Heaven's blessing to hallow the tree,
As a sceptre for England, the queen of the sea.

Chorus:

Heart of oak are our ships,
Hearts of oak are our men,
We always are ready, steady boys, steady,
To charge and to conquer again and again.

The sapling shot up and stuck firm to the ground;
It defied every tempest that bellow'd around;
And still was it seen with fresh vigour to shoot,
When the blood of our martyrs had moisten'd its root.

(Chorus)

But the worms of corruption had eaten their way
Through its bark; till a Wardle has swept them away,
He has sworn, no such reptiles our tree shall infest,
And our patriots soon shall extirpate the nest.

(Chorus)

Yon tyrant, whose rule abject Europe bemoans —
Yon brood of usurpers who sit on her thrones —
Shall look on our country, and tremble with awe,
Where a son of the Monarch has bow'd to the law,

(Chorus)

Now long live the Briton, who dar'd to revive
The spirit which Britons scarce felt was alive;
His name shall be carv'd, while of freedom we sing,
On the oak that was planted by Alfred our King.

(Chorus)

== See also ==
- Royal Air Force March Past
