= Vincenzo Ruffo =

Italian composer

Vincenzo Ruffo (c. 1508 – 9 February 1587) was an Italian composer of the Renaissance. He was one of the composers most responsive to the musical reforms suggested by the Council of Trent, especially in his composition of masses, and as such was an influential member of the Counter-Reformation.

Vincenzo Ruffo was born at Verona, and became a priest there in 1531. Most likely he studied with Biagio Rossetti, the organist at the cathedral in Verona. Ruffo published his first book of music in 1542. Also in 1542 he became maestro di cappella at the cathedral in Savona, but he only held this position for a year; the cathedral was destroyed in 1543 by the Genoese, and Ruffo fled.

In either 1543 or 1544 he went to Milan to work for Alfonso d'Avalos, who was the governor of Milan at this time. When d'Avalos was called back to Madrid in 1546, Ruffo went back to in Verona, where he was the music director at the Accademia Filarmonica in 1551-1552, superseding Jan Nasco; in 1554 he became the choirmaster at the cathedral of Verona. While there he probably taught Gian Matteo Asola and Marc' Antonio Ingegneri, the teacher of Monteverdi; it is possible, though not proven, that he taught Andrea Gabrieli there as well.

His music during this time was strongly influenced by the Franco-Flemish school, but when he in 1563 became maestro di cappella in the cathedral of Milan under Carlo Borromeo, he began composing in the Tridentine style of which Borromeo was a strong supporter. One of the criticisms of the Council of Trent was that music had become so contrapuntally complex that it was impossible to understand the words being sung: Ruffo responded by composing masses in as simple a style as was consistent with clear expression of the text. Late in his life, however, he evidently became dissatisfied with composing masses in a strictly chordal style and returned to using a moderately contrapuntal style.

In 1564 several of his compositions were published in Milan; two works from this book were included many years later in the English manuscript known as the Dow Partbooks. In 1572 he became the maestro di cappella at Pistoia, and then Milan again; for his final job he had a similar employment at the cathedral in Sacile, where he died in 1587.
