= Nicholas Strogers =

English composer

Nicholas Strogers (also Strowger) was an English composer, active between the years 1560 and 1575. Nothing is known about Strogers' early life and music education. Between Christmas 1564 and 1575, he was a parish clerk at St Dunstan-in-the-West, London, where he was in charge of the music and possibly also played the church organ.

Strogers's works that have survived are: seven pieces of sacred vocal music, six pages of secular vocal music, nine instrumental works for consort of instruments, and five keyboard pieces, including a fantasia also found in the Fitzwilliam Virginal Book. Five of his compositions were included in the manuscript known as the Dow Partbooks. Of all his works, the Short Service was the one most widely copied, having been included in Benjamin Cosyn's collection as well as in the Chirk Castle Partbooks, to cite a few.

== Bibliography ==
- J.C. Pistor, Nicholas Strogers, Tudor Composer, and his Circle, Doctorate thesis, Oxford University, 1971.
