= Maxwell Ayrton =

British architect (1874–1960)

Maxwell Ayrton

Ormrod Maxwell Ayrton (1 April 1874 – 18 February 1960), known as Maxwell Ayrton, was an English architect. He spent most of his adult life working in London, and designed houses, public buildings, and bridges.

== Early life ==
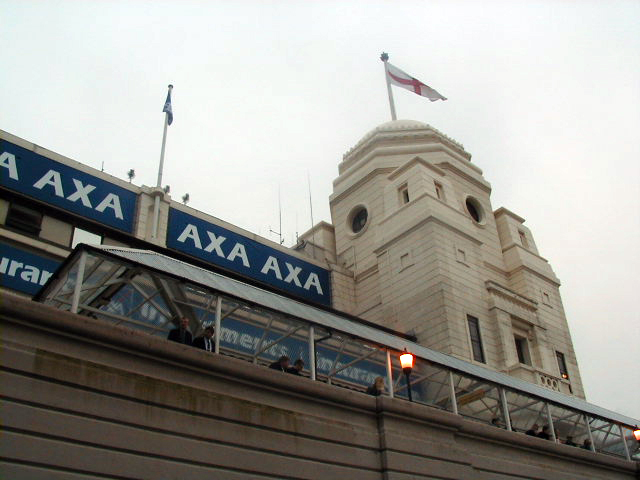
One of the Twin Towers of Ayrton's old Wembley Stadium (1923)

Maxwell Ayrton was born in Chester to William Frances Ayrton, a wealthy wine-merchant who was a partner and co-founder of the firm of Ayrton & Groome, and his second wife Pauline. Two of Maxwell's full brothers also gained prominence. The eldest, William Ayrton (1861–1916), was an artist based in Suffolk. Randle Ayrton was a leading actor of stage and screen.

The Ayrton family originated in Yorkshire. Maxwell's forebear Edward Ayrton was mayor of Ripon in 1760, and laid the foundations for the family's subsequent prominence.

== Career ==
Ayrton began his career in 1890 as an articled apprentice to Harry Beswick of Chester, remaining with him until 1897. He then moved to London, where from 1897 to 1899 he was an assistant first to Richard Creed, then to William Alfred Pite, and finally to Edwin Landseer Lutyens. During these years he studied at the South Kensington Schools of the Royal College of Art. He passed the Royal Institute of British Architects qualifying examination and was admitted an Associate on 30 November 1903, having been proposed by Pite, John William Simpson and Lacy William Ridge.

Ayrton was in practice on his own from 1899, and in 1903 was at 14, Belsize Park Gardens, London. One of his early buildings was a house called Hall Ingle, at Heath End, Checkendon (1902), "...by Mr. O. Maxwell Ayrton, for, and decorated by, Arthur Hacker, Esq., ARA". Hacker painted Ayrton's wife and exhibited the portrait at the Royal Academy in 1902.

In 1905, Ayrton joined John William Simpson's practice, and from then on he carried out most of the firm's design work. He became a partner in the firm in 1910 and was elected a Fellow of the Royal Institute of British Architects in 1920, having been proposed by his old master Lutyens and by Sir Aston Webb, who at the time was President of the Royal Academy.

Simpson's practice included much work for schools, and Ayrton was the architect of a new chapel for Gresham's School, Holt, constructed in knapped flint and limestone (flushwork), with two angle turrets and an embattled parapet, between 1912 and 1916, which is now a listed building.

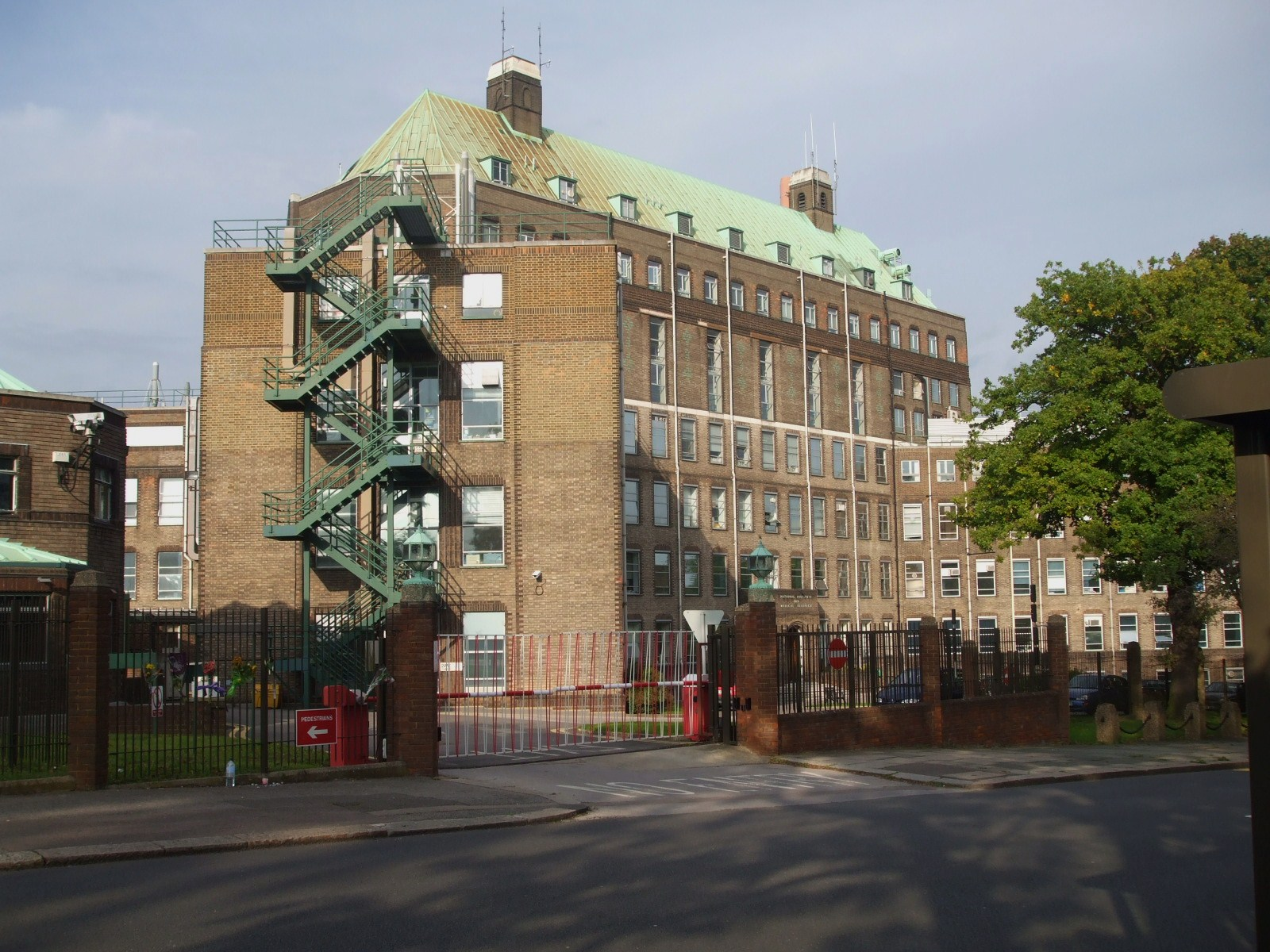
The National Institute for Medical Research main building at Mill Hill

Ayrton's most notable public building from his years with Simpson was the old Wembley Stadium, a simple structure in reinforced concrete which they designed together, built between 1921 and 1923 for the British Empire Exhibition at Wembley Park of 1924 to 1925. It had echoes of the Olympic stadium of 1908 at White City. Simpson received a knighthood for their Exhibition work, while as a result of it Ayrton came into an association with the project's civil engineer, Owen Williams, and this led to their working together on the design of Williams's bridges in Scotland.

In 1928 Ayrton's partnership with Simpson was dissolved. Although by then over seventy, Simpson continued his practice, taking into partnership Frank W. Knight and Henley Cornford, while Ayrton returned to private practice. His work was also part of the painting event in the art competition at the 1928 Summer Olympics.

Ayrton's National Institute for Medical Research at Mill Hill, London, is an imposing copper-roofed building. Although construction began in 1937, it was delayed by the Second World War, and the opening ceremony in the presence of King George VI and Queen Elizabeth did not take place until 5 May 1950.

Ayrton was still in practice when he died in 1960 at the age of eighty-five. The Journal of the Royal Institute of British Architects reported that "Mr R. Courtenay Theobald, following the death of his partner Mr Maxwell Ayrton in February 1960, will practise under his own name from 9 Church Row, Hampstead, London NW3 and 21A Heath Street, NW3."

== Personal life ==
Maxwell's son, Tony Ayrton (1909–1943), followed the vocation of his uncle rather than his father and became an artist, before serving as a distinguished camouflage-officer in World War Two, but died on active service in 1943. Maxwell's granddaughter, Tessa Beaver (1932–2018), also became an artist; she was the daughter of Maxwell's daughter, Virginia, and of Courtenay Theobald, his last practice partner as well as his son-in-law.

== Legacy ==
Ayrton House, a housing development on the site of the National Institute for Medical Research, is named after Maxwell Ayrton.

== Major works ==
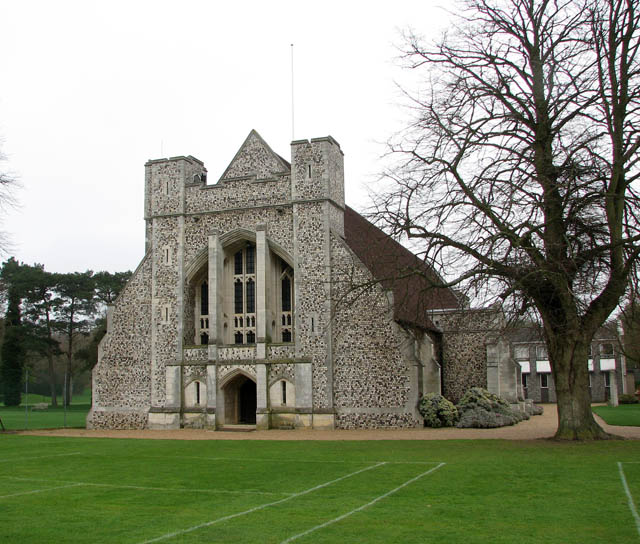
Chapel of Gresham's School, Norfolk

- Chapel of Gresham's School (1912–1916)
- New Western Australian Offices, London (1915, with John William Simpson)
- Beach House, Worthing (refurbishment, 1918)
- Wembley Stadium, Palace of Industry, and Palace of Engineering (1921–1923, all now demolished) for the British Empire Exhibition, Wembley (1924–1925) (with John William Simpson)
- Wing and studio addition to One Oak, Frognal (1927)
- St Andrew's Presbyterian Church (now United Reformed Church), Cheam, Sutton (1933)
- Twickenham Bridge (1933)
- National Institute for Medical Research (1937)

== Publications ==
- Ayrton, Maxwell (1903). Some Modern Weather Vanes.
- Ayrton, Maxwell; Silcock, Arnold. (1929). Wrought Iron and its Decorative Use. London: Country Life.
