= Lawrence Squier =

English choirmaster and cleric

Lawrence Squier (died 1493) was an English cleric and choirmaster.

King Henry VII of England formally appointed him Master of the Children of the Chapel Royal in 1486, a post which he retained until 1493. He was the first to be appointed with the official title that all succeeding postholders held, Magister Puerorum Capelle (Master of the Children of the Chapel), the previous incumbent being "Master of Song".

Unlike most other holders of the post, Squier was not a Gentleman of the Chapel but was a chaplain in the royal household. Prior to becoming Master of the Children he was a prebendary of the Collegiate Church of St Mary, Warwick.
