= Charley Evans =

American baseball player

- Right fielder
- Born: February 11, 1892; Anne Arundel County, Maryland, U.S.
- Died: November 7, 1977 (aged 85); Woodlawn, Maryland, U.S.
- Batted: Unknown Threw: Unknown

Negro league baseball debut
- 1921, for the Baltimore Black Sox

Last appearance
- 1921, for the Baltimore Black Sox

Teams
- Baltimore Black Sox (1921)

Charles Evans (February 11, 1892 - November 7, 1977) was an American professional baseball right fielder in the Negro leagues. He played with the Baltimore Black Sox in 1921.
