= Charles Albert Evans =

American physician (1912–2008)

- Born: February 18, 1912; Minneapolis, Minnesota
- Died: December 4, 2008 (aged 96)
- Education: University of Minnesota BS, MD, PhD
- Occupation: Physician
- Organization: American Society for Microbiology
- Known for: Research on polio
- Spouse: Allie Ann Christman (1939- )
- Children: 4
- Honours: Fellow of the American Association for the Advancement of Science

Charles Albert Evans (February 18, 1912, Minneapolis – December 4, 2008) was an American physician, professor of microbiology, and researcher on poliomyelitis virus. He was the president of the American Society for Microbiology in 1960.

== Biography ==
At the University of Minnesota, Evans graduated in 1935 with a B.S., in 1937 with an M.D., and in 1942 with a Ph.D. in bacteriology. His Ph.D. thesis is entitled A study of herpetic infections of the nervous system. From 1938 to 1941 he was employed by the Bureau of Biological Survey and, simultaneously, was an assistant scientist and later an associate scientist at the University of Minnesota. From 1941 to 1942 he was a research fellow at the University of Rochester. In the department of bacteriology of the University of Minnesota, he was from 1942 to 1944 an assistant professor and from 1944 to 1946 an associate professor. In the department of bacteriology of Seattle's University of Washington, he was a full professor from 1946 until his retirement as professor emeritus after 36 years of professorial service. He chaired the department from 1946 to 1970. He served as associate director of the Fred Hutchinson Cancer Research Center for a few years in its formative phase.

Evans was from 1951 to 1955 a member of the editorial board for the Journal of Bacteriology and from 1954 to 1956 an associate editor for the journal Virology. He was the author of coauthor of more than 200 scientific publications. The 1954 Nobel Prize lecture by John Enders mentions the importance of the collaborative research of Evans and Robert Gladding Green (1895–1947) in demonstrating that the poliomyelitis viruses are not strict neurotropes. The lecture also cites two pages coauthored by Evans with Wayne Maurice Smith (1922–2019) and Velma C. Chambers (1909–2003).

Although best known for his research on the growth of poliomyelitis virus in cell and tissue culture, Evans also did research on papillomavirus infections in rabbits, population cycles in snowshoe hares, encephalitis in foxes, canine distemper, and viral infections of intraocular tissues. In the later years of his career, he did research on the ecology of skin microflora and its role in the etiology and pathogenesis of disease.

Evans was elected in 1946 a fellow of the American Association for the Advancement of Science.

In December 1939 he married Allie Ann Christman (1917–2014). Nicholas J. Evans, one of their two sons, died in 1948 at the age of six. Upon his death, Charles A. Evans was survived by his widow, one son, two daughters, and six grandchildren. In his honor, the University of Washington's Department of Microbiology awards the Dr. Charles A. and Allie Ann Evans Endowed Scholarship.

== Selected publications ==
- Evans, Charles A. (1938). "Observations on Hibernating Bats with Especial Reference to Reproduction and Splenic Adaptation". The American Naturalist. 72 (742): 480–484. doi:10.1086/280802. S2CID 84847373.
- Green, R. G.; Evans, C. A. (1940). "A Deficiency Disease of Foxes". Science. 92 (2381): 154–155. Bibcode:1940Sci....92..154G. doi:10.1126/science.92.2381.154. PMID 17815394. S2CID 25929276.
- Evans, Charles A. (1947). "Does Poliomyelitis Virus Grow in Sewage?". Acta Medica Scandinavica. 126 (6): 541–545. doi:10.1111/j.0954-6820.1947.tb19041.x.
- Hotta, Susumu; Evans, Charles A. (1956). "Cultivation of Mouse-Adapted Dengue Virus (Type 1) in Rhesus Monkey Tissue Culture". The Journal of Infectious Diseases. 98 (1): 88–97. doi:10.1093/infdis/98.1.88. JSTOR 30094234. PMID 13295630.
- Sample, Donald W.; Evans, C. A. (1957). "Estimates of the infection rates for poliomyelitis virus in the years preceding the poliomyelitis epidemics of 1916 in New York and 1945 on Mauritius". Journal of Hygiene. 55 (2): 254–265. doi:10.1017/S0022172400037141. PMC 2217917. PMID 13439175.
- Evans, C. A.; Chambers, Velma C.; Giedt, W. R.; Wilson, A. N. (1957). "The immune status of a population at the termination of a severe epidemic of poliomyelitis". Journal of Hygiene. 55 (2): 239–253. doi:10.1017/S002217240003713X. PMC 2217915. PMID 13439174.
- Evans, C. A.; Gorman, L. R.; Ito, Y.; Weiser, R. S. (1962). "A Vaccination Procedure which increases the Frequency of Regressions of Shope Papillomas of Rabbits". Nature. 193 (4812): 288–289. Bibcode:1962Natur.193..288E. doi:10.1038/193288a0. PMID 13890963. S2CID 4215425.
- Hellström, Ingegerd; Hellström, Karl Erik; Evans, Charles A.; Heppner, Gloria H.; Pierce, George E.; Yang, James P. S. (1969). "Serum-Mediated Protection of Neoplastic Cells from Inhibition by Lymphocytes Immune to Their Tumor-Specific Antigens". Proceedings of the National Academy of Sciences. 62 (2): 362–368. Bibcode:1969PNAS...62..362H. doi:10.1073/pnas.62.2.362. PMC 277801. PMID 5256215.
- Evans, C. A.; Mattern, K. L.; Hallam, S. L. (1978). "Isolation and identification of Peptococcus saccharolyticus from human skin". Journal of Clinical Microbiology. 7 (3): 261–264. doi:10.1128/jcm.7.3.261-264.1978. PMC 274911. PMID 649761.
- Evans, Charles A.; Mattern, Kathy L. (1979). "The Aerobic Growth of Propionibacterium acnes in Primary Cultures from Skin". Journal of Investigative Dermatology. 72 (2): 103–106. doi:10.1111/1523-1747.ep12530309. PMID 422866.
- Larson, E. L.; Strom, M. S.; Evans, C. A. (1980). "Analysis of three variables in sampling solutions used to assay bacteria of hands: Type of solution, use of antiseptic neutralizers, and solution temperature". Journal of Clinical Microbiology. 12 (3): 355–360. doi:10.1128/jcm.12.3.355-360.1980. PMC 273590. PMID 7012171.
- Evans, Charles A.; Strom, Mark S. (1982). "Eight Year Persistence of Individual Differences in the Bacterial Flora of the Forehead". Journal of Investigative Dermatology. 79 (1): 51–52. doi:10.1111/1523-1747.ep12510587. PMID 7086176.
