= John Weldon (musician) =

English composer (1676–1736)

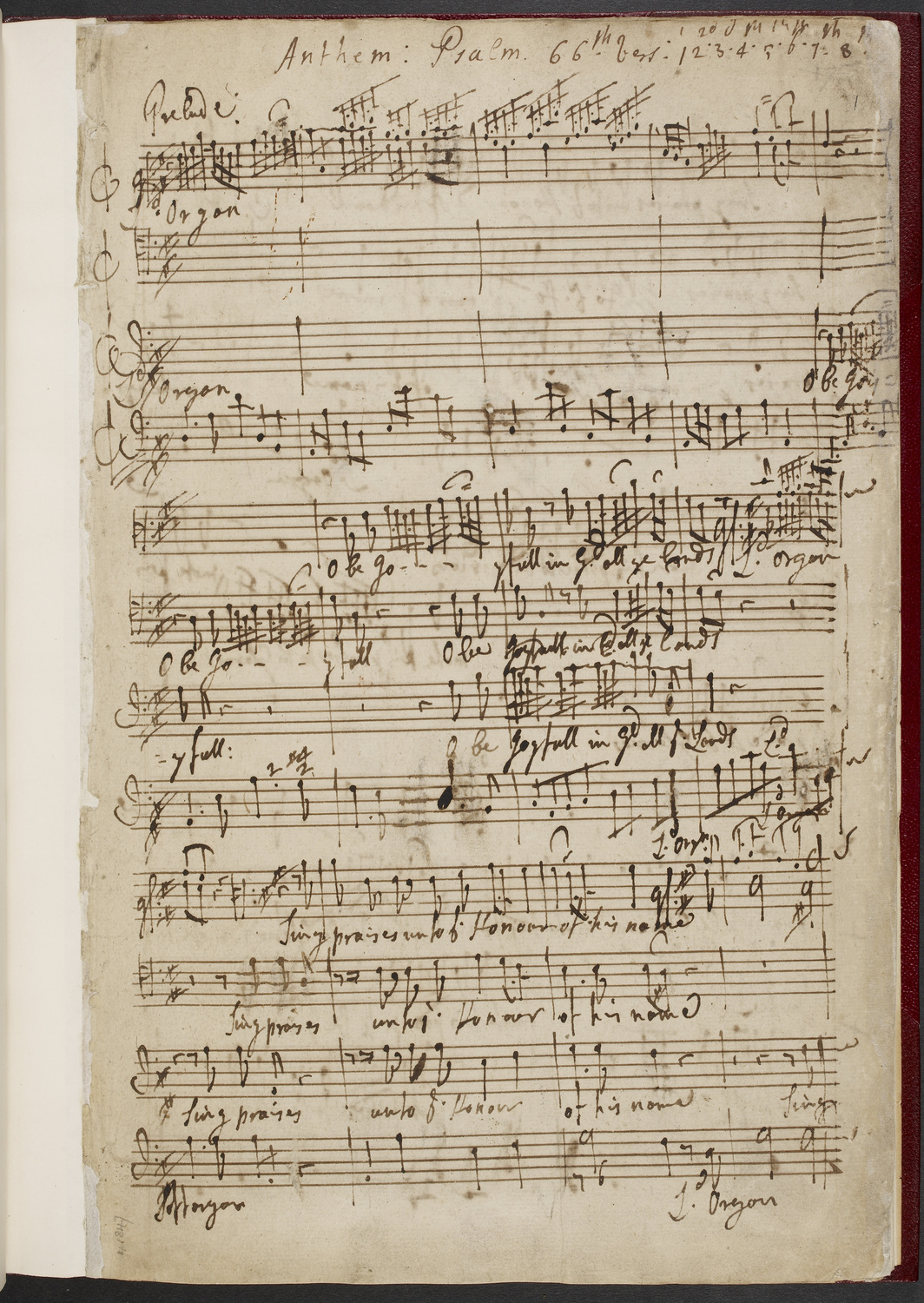
John Weldon's manuscript of "O be joyful". In the British Library.

John Weldon (19 January 1676 – 7 May 1736) was an English composer.

== Life ==
Born at Chichester in the south of England, he was educated at Eton College, where he was a chorister, and later received musical instruction from Henry Purcell. By 1694 Weldon had been appointed organist of New College in Oxford and became well known in the musical life of that city, writing music for masques as well as performing his organist duties.

Some believe he set Shakespeare's play The Tempest to music in 1695, although others attribute that to Henry Purcell.

Weldon moved to London and in 1701 took part in a competition to set Congreve's libretto The Judgement of Paris to music. Perhaps surprisingly, Weldon's setting was chosen over contributions by his older, more experienced and better-known competitors, Daniel Purcell (younger brother of Henry), John Eccles and Godfrey Finger. Even more curiously, Purcell's and Eccles's scores were later published by John Walsh. Weldon's however was not and remains in manuscript, though the lack of recognition of his relatively new name may also have played a part. There is some evidence to suggest that the judges of the competition were not entirely impartial, though it has also been suggested that Weldon's setting was considered less old-fashioned than his somewhat older contemporaries. In the same year as the competition, Weldon was made a Gentleman of the Chapel Royal.

Having established his reputation in London, Weldon continued for some years to write music for the theatre. Music for The Tempest, until the mid-1960s believed to have been composed by Henry Purcell, was in all probability written by Weldon for the Drury Lane Theatre, in 1712. Weldon's musical style owes much to Purcell's influence but is more Italianate and also embraces the 'modern' French styles and forms that were becoming increasingly popular at the time.

John Weldon devoted the latter part of his life almost exclusively to the duties of the Chapel Royal and to writing church music. He succeeded John Blow (1649–1708) as Chapel Royal organist, and in 1715 was made second composer under William Croft (1678–1727). Six solo anthems were published by John Walsh in 1716 under the title Divine Harmony. They were claimed to have been sung by the famous tenor, Richard Elford, though it seems that at least some of the anthems were written for one Mr Bowyer during Weldon's time at New College. Weldon also held the post of organist at two London Churches, St Bride's, Fleet Street (from 1702) and St Martin-in-the-Fields (from 1714). He died aged 60 on 7 May 1736 and is buried in St. Paul's Church, Covent Garden, London. Some of his sacred music is published by Music 18.

=== Descendants ===
John Weldon's grandson Samuel Thomas Champnes would follow in his musical footsteps and become one of Handel's soloists. Many of their descendants were involved in the church and took the Weldon surname as their second name, often writing the music for hymns in Hymns Ancient and Modern.

== Works ==
=== Sacred music ===
Until the early 21st century, John Weldon's work had been judged primarily on the basis of the six anthems published in Divine Harmony during his lifetime and the two anthems published in Boyce's Cathedral Music. The six solo anthems have much to commend them, but also weaknesses in sequential and (to a lesser degree) tonal control. The seventh, O God, thou hast cast us out is rather more sophisticated and as such gained a place in Arnold's Cathedral Music. Also gaining a place in this collection was the full-with-verse anthem, Who can tell how oft he offendeth. It is this anthem that Weldon excels in a synthesis of Blow/Purcellian structure and Handelian harmony. The most successful of Weldon's writing, though, is found in the verse anthems. In these he conveys a wide range of emotions and develops ensemble writing techniques in systematic ways. Particularly successful are the anthems conveying joy and praise with unbounded elation. The solo and ensemble writing in these verse anthems is particularly strong, with real virtuosity required on the part of the singers.

Anthems in (probable) chronological order:

Title	Index number	Genre	Probable date
O praise God in his holiness	JW24	Short Full Anthem	1701
O praise the Lord for it is a good thing	JW25	Short Full Anthem	1701
O Lord, rebuke me not	JW1	Solo Anthem	Pre-1702
I will lift up mine eyes	JW5	Solo Anthem	Pre-1702
O how pleasant are thy dwellings	JW8	Solo Anthem	Pre-1702
Blessed be the Lord my strength	JW2	Solo Anthem	Pre-1702
O praise the Lord of heaven	JW3	Solo Anthem	Pre-1702
O praise the Lord, laud ye the name of the Lord (Oxford version)	JW9a	Verse Anthem	Pre-1702
Thou art my portion	JW4	Solo Anthem	Probably pre-1702
Have mercy upon me	JW6	Solo Anthem	c.1700–1705
O God thou hast cast us out	JW7	Solo Anthem	1703/4
O sing unto the Lord a new song	JW12	Verse Anthem	9 January 1707/8
Ponder my words	JW15	Verse Anthem	1708–1712
Praise the Lord ye servants	JW14	Verse Anthem	1708–1712
O praise the Lord, laud ye the name of the Lord (Chapel Royal version)	JW9b	Verse Anthem	1708–1712
Sanctus and Gloria	JW26/27	Full Service (with verses)	c.1708
Rejoice in the Lord	JW13	Verse Anthem	17 February 1708/9
O praise the Lord, ye that fear him	JW16	Verse Anthem	After February 1708/9; before 1713/4
O give thanks unto the Lord	JW35	Verse Anthem	22 November 1709
Blessed is the man that feareth	JW34	Verse Anthem	?1708–1712
Blessed are those that are undefiled	JW33	Verse Anthem	?1708–1712
The King shall rejoice	JW17	Verse Anthem	c.1710-c.1715
Hear my crying, O God	JW19	Full-with-verses Anthem	?1712-c.1715
In thee, O Lord	JW20	Full-with-verses Anthem	?1712- c.1715
Turn thou us, O good Lord	JW22	Full-with-verses Anthem	?c.1711-c.1713
The Princes of the People	JW37	Verse Anthem	Pre-1714, probably 1713
Service in D	JW28/29/31/32	Full Service (with verses)	1714–1717
O be joyful	JW10	Verse Anthem	c.1715–1722
O Lord, let me hear thy loving kindness	JW11	Verse Anthem	c.1715–1722
I will love thee, O Lord	JW36	Verse Anthem	c.1715–1722
Who can tell how oft he offendeth	JW21	Full-with-verses Anthem	c.1715–1716
Let God arise	JW18	Verse Anthem	?c.1715–1722

=== Operas ===
- The Judgement of Paris (6 May 1701)
- Orpheus and Euridice (c. 1701)
- Britain's Happines (1704)
- The Tempest (1712)

== Cultural offices ==
Cultural offices
Preceded by new post	Organist of the St Martin-in-the-Fields; 1714–1736	Succeeded by Joseph Kelway
