= The Brabant Ensemble =

British choir

The Brabant Ensemble is an early music choir based in Oxford, directed by Stephen Rice.

== Discography ==
- Clemens non Papa: Missa "Ecce quam bonum" Behold How Joyful
- Antoine Brumel: Missa de Beata Virgine,
- Palestrina: Missa Ad coenam Agni
- Jean Mouton: Missa Tu es Petrus,
- Cipriano de Rore: Missa Doulce memoire,
- Pierre de Manchicourt: Missa Cuidez vous que Dieu nous faille,
- Clemens non Papa: Missa pro defunctis (Requiem)
- Orlando di Lasso: Prophetiae Sibyllarum Missa Amor ecco colei,
- Cristobal de Morales: Magnificat
- Dominique Phinot: Missa Si bona suscepimus,
- Pierre Moulu: Missa Missus est Gabriel angelus,
- Nicolas Gombert: Motets Tribulatio et angustia
- Music from the Chirk Castle Part-Books
- Thomas Crecquillon: Missa Mort m'a prive,
- Jacquet of Mantua: Missa Surge Petre & Motets
- Pierre de la Rue: Missa Nuncqua fue pena mayor
