= Charles Smart Evans =

English vocalist and composer

Charles Smart Evans (1778 – 4 January 1849) was an English vocalist and composer.

Evans was a chorister under Dr. Edmund Ayrton, and in 1808 a gentleman of the Chapel Royal. His name appears among the alto singers in the chorus of the "Ancient Concerts" of 1798, and he took part with John Braham and others in the music performed at Weber's funeral in 1826.

Four of Evans's part-songs gained prizes from the Glee and Catch Clubs, namely: Beauties, have you seen a toy? (1811); Fill all the glasses (1812); Ode to the Memory of Samuel Webbe (1817), for Samuel Webbe; and Great Bacchus (1821). Subsequently, he became a catholic and a member of the choir of the chapel of the Portuguese embassy. Evans wrote a Magnificat and some motets, contained in books iv. and v. of Alfred Novello's "Collection of Motets". He was also the composer of many songs.
