= Michael Wise (musician) =

English organist and composer

Michael Wise (born c.1647 in Salisbury, died there 24 August 1687) was an English organist and composer. He sang as a child in the choir of the Chapel Royal as one of the earliest groups of choristers there after the Restoration of King Charles II.

He left as his voice changed in September 1663. From 1665 to 1668, he served as a lay clerk in St George's Chapel, Windsor, and Eton College until he was appointed organist, lay vicar and choirmaster at Salisbury Cathedral on 29 April 1668. During his time there, he claimed the dean and chapter 'wrongly deflected cathedral monies', a claim he could not back up. Wise had been fairly commonly accused of neglecting his duty at Salisbury; a deputy organist and substitute instructor were paid for while Wise retained all of his stipend due to his skill and compositions. In 1683 he was accused of negligence, profanity, drunkenness 'and other excesses in his life and conversation' at the episcopal visitation. In 1676 he became a Gentleman of the Chapel Royal, while retaining his commitments in Salisbury.

Following the disruption of musical activities at St Paul's Cathedral as a consequence of the Great Fire of London, Wise was appointed almoner and Master of the Choristers in January 1687, on the recommendation of King James II.

He was killed during a confrontation with a Salisbury night watchman after a quarrel with his wife (who continued to live in Salisbury):

"He had quarrelled with his wife on some trivial matter, and rushed out of his house. The watchman met him while he was yet boiling with rage, and commanding him to stand and give an account of himself, he struck the guardian of the peace to the ground, who in return aimed a blow at his assailant with his bill, which broke his skull, of the consequence whereof he died."

Peter Isaacke and John Blow were appointed as his successors at Salisbury and St. Paul's, respectively. He was buried at St Thomas's Church in Salisbury.

== Music ==
Much of his church music and catches survive, mostly in manuscript form.

As well as Service Settings, his compositions include anthems such as:

- How are the mighty fallen
- Awake up, my glory
- The ways of Zion do mourn
- Blessed is he that considereth the poor and needy
- Prepare ye the way of the Lord
- Awake, put on thy strength

Wise also composed some catches and at least one once famous drinking song, Old Chiron.

He often composed for the unusual combination of a duet of bass and treble voices – for instance, in Old Chiron and The Ways of Zion do mourn.

The choir of Gonville and Caius College, Cambridge issued a CD of Wise's Sacred Choral Music in 2008.

Cultural offices
Preceded by Giles Tompkins	Organist and Master of the Choristers of Salisbury Cathedral; 1668–1687	Succeeded by Peter Isaacke
Preceded by Randall Jewett	Almoner and Master of the Choristers of St Paul's Cathedral; 1687	Succeeded by John Blow
