= Thomas Day (musician) =

English Renaissance choirmaster, singer and lutenist

Thomas Day was a singer, theorbo lutenist and choirmaster.

He was appointed Master of the Children of the Chapel Royal in 1633 and was also Master of the Choristers at Westminster Abbey.

He also served as a musician to the Princes Henry and Charles.
