= Woodlawn, Maryland =

Woodlawn is the name of some places in the U.S. state of Maryland:

- Woodlawn, Baltimore County, Maryland
- Woodlawn, Cecil County, Maryland
- Woodlawn, Prince George's County, Maryland
- Woodlawn (Columbia, Maryland)
