= Charles Evans (footballer) =

Welsh footballer

Personal information
- Full name: John Charles Evans
- Date of birth: 31 January 1897
- Place of birth: Cardiff, Wales
- Date of death: 1939 (aged 41–42)
- Place of death: Frome, England
- Height: 5 ft 10 in (1.78 m)
- Position: Wing half

Senior career*
Years	Team	Apps	(Gls)
1921–1922	Cardiff Camerons		
1922–1924	Cardiff City	0	(0)
1924–1925	Northampton Town	18	(2)
1925–1926	Grimsby Town	5	(0)
1927–1928	Barry	13	(13)
- * Club domestic league appearances and goals

John Charles Evans (31 January 1897 – 1939) was a Welsh professional footballer who played as a wing half.

During his time with Grimsby Town, Evans also played cricket for Grimsby Cricket Club and worked as the club's groundsman. He later played for Barry in the 1927–28 season. He died in Frome Hospital in 1939.
