= Richard Elford =

British singer

Richard Elford (baptised 3 January 1677 – 29 October 1714) was an English singer, the leading figure in his field in Queen Anne's London.

== Life ==
Elford was born in Lincoln to Thomas and Ann Elford. He was baptised at Saint Margaret in the Close Church. When young he was a chorister at Lincoln Cathedral, and later sang at Durham Cathedral. Restless, he came to London to try the stage.

Elford was sworn a gentleman of the Chapel Royal on 2 August 1702, and was also appointed lay vicar at St Paul's Cathedral and Westminster Abbey. Among those who wrote sacred music for him were William Croft and John Weldon. Elford was also chosen to take part in the performance before Queen Anne at St. James's Palace of John Eccles's Birthday Songs, in 1703. Elford died on 29 October 1714. His brother Thomas was a singer in the Dublin Cathedral choir.

In Henry Carey's poem, "On the Death of the late famous Mr. Elford," published in 1720, his loss is deplored in extravagant terms. It was set to music by Croft.
