= Charles Evans (cricketer, born 1851) =

English cricketer and British Army officer

Personal information
- Full name: Charles William Henry Evans
- Born: 9 August 1851; Guernsey
- Died: 2 November 1909 (aged 58); Bognor, Sussex, England
- Batting: Right-handed
- Role: Wicket-keeper

Domestic team information
- Years: Team
- 1871: Cambridge University

Career statistics
Competition	First-class
Matches	3
Runs scored	33
Batting average	6.60
100s/50s	–/–
Top score	8*
Catches/stumpings	2/2
- Source: Cricinfo, 2 August 2019

Charles William Henry Evans DSO (19 August 1851 – 2 November 1909) was an English first-class cricketer and British Army officer. Evans served in the army from 1874–1900, seeing action during the Anglo–Egyptian War, the Mahdist War and campaigns in the North-West Frontier Province of British India, for which he was decorated with the Distinguished Service Order. In addition to his military career, Evans also played first-class cricket for Cambridge University and the Gentlemen of England.

== Life and military career ==
The son of the surgeon Charles Evans of Margate, he was born in Guernsey in August 1851. He was educated at Haileybury, before attending Gonville and Caius College, Cambridge. While studying at Cambridge, he made two appearances in first-class cricket for Cambridge University in 1871, against the Marylebone Cricket Club and the Gentlemen of England. After graduating from Cambridge, he enlisted in the 69th Regiment of Foot as a sub-lieutenant in February 1874. He transferred to the 81st Regiment of Foot in August 1875, while the following year he had transferred as a lieutenant to the 50th Regiment of Foot by September 1876. Evans made his third and final appearance in first-class cricket in 1879, when he played for the Gentlemen of England against the Gentlemen of Kent at Canterbury.

He was promoted to the rank of captain in November 1883. Evans served in the Anglo–Egyptian War with the Queen's Own Royal West Kent Regiment, following it amalgamation with the 50th Foot. Soon after he served in the Mahdist War, seeing action in the Nile Expedition. He was promoted to the rank of major in 1890, before commanding the 1st Battalion, Queen's Own Royal West Kent Regiment during operations in British India alongside the Malakand Field Force during the Siege of Malakand in 1897, with Evans also seeing action in the Mohmand campaign of 1897–98. He was mentioned in dispatches and made a Companion of the Distinguished Service Order for his actions during the campaign. He was promoted to the rank of lieutenant colonel in December 1898. Evans retired from active service in March 1900. He died at Bognor in November 1909.
