= Edmund Ayrton =

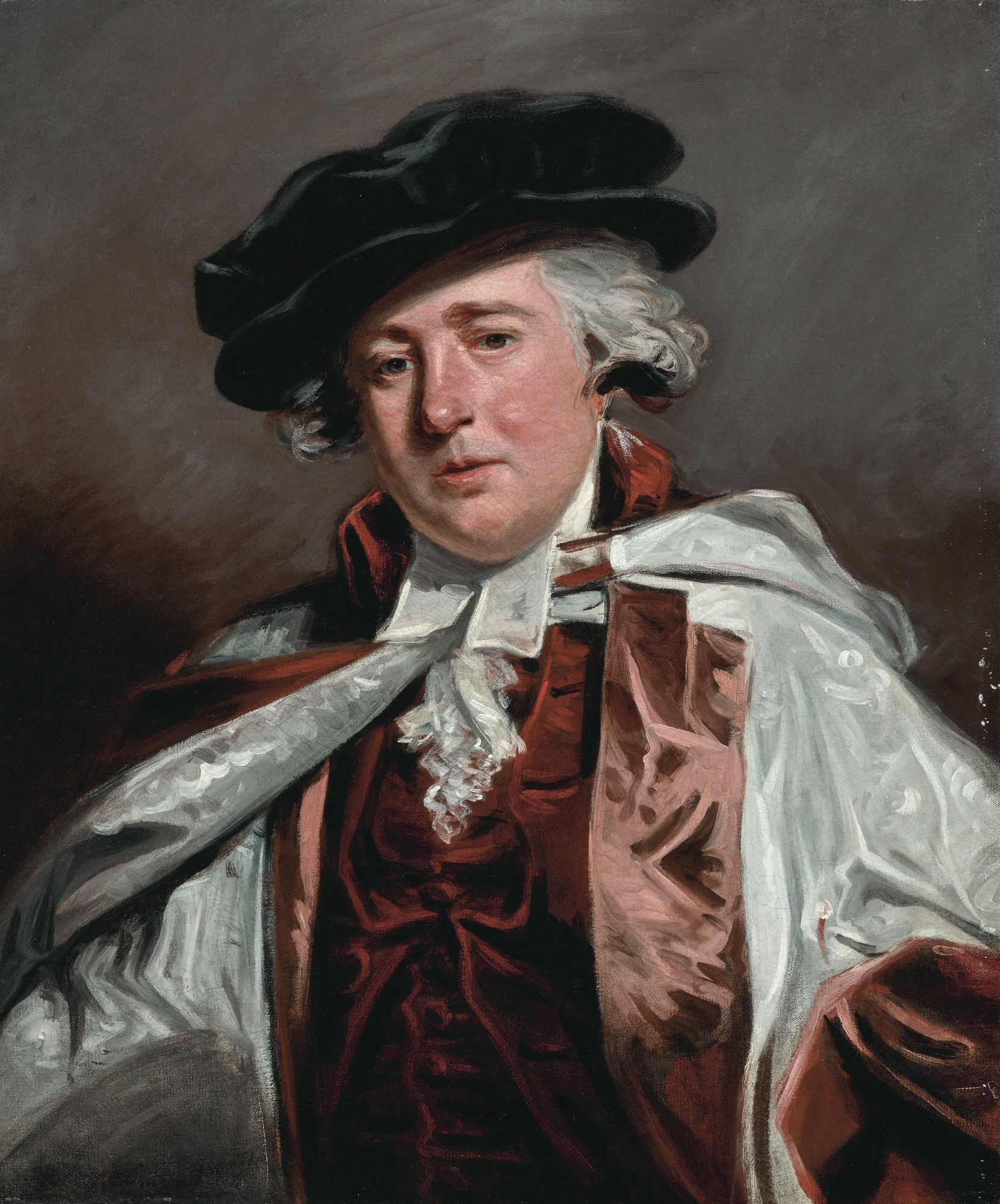
- Edmund Ayrton c. 1784

Background information
- Born: 1734; Ripon, England
- Died: May 1808 (aged 73–74)
- Instrument: Pipe organ

Dr. Edmund Ayrton (1734 – 22 May 1808) was an English organist who was Master of the Children of the Chapel Royal.

== Early life ==
Edmund Ayrton was born in Ripon and baptised on 19 November 1734. His father was Edward Ayrton, a 'barber chirurgion,' who became a magistrate, an alderman on 14 August 1758 and then mayor of Ripon in 1760.

Edmund was the second son of the barber-surgeon and it had been thought that he would take holy orders, as had his grandfather and other forebears. However, displaying considerable musical talent, he was placed under the supervision of Dr. James Nares, the organist of York Minster. He succeeded Samuel Wise as organist, auditor, and rector chori of Southwell Minster in 1755.

== Career ==
Ayrton became a member of the Royal Society of Musicians on 2 June 1765 (Records of Roy. Soc. of Musicians). He was appointed a gentleman of the Chapel Royal in 1764, and soon after became a vicar choral of St. Paul's Cathedral, and a lay vicar of Westminster Abbey. On 16 January, 1779 Edmund Ayrton was initiated as a Freemason along with five other musicians in Somerset House Lodge No. 2. He later became the Organist of Grand Chapter. In 1780, Ayrton succeeded his mentor Nares as Master of the Children of the Chapel Royal. After a quarter-century in post, Ayrton resigned the mastership in 1805.

In 1784 Ayrton was awarded the degree of Mus. Doc. by the University of Cambridge. On this occasion the anthem he wrote as an exercise was performed in the church of Great St. Mary's; it was later also performed in London, at the peace thanksgiving at St. Paul's on 29 July 1784. The University of Oxford also conferred, ad eundem, the degree of Mus. Doc. on Dr. Ayrton in 1788.

Summary of Appointments:

- 1755: Organist of Southwell Minster [1755 - 1764]
- 1764: Gentleman of the Chapel Royal
- 1767: Vicar Choral of St. Paul's Cathedral
- 1780: Lay Vicar of Westminster Abbey
- 1780: Master of the Children of the Chapel Royal [1780 - 1805]

== Family life ==
Whilst at Southwell Minster, Ayrton married Ann, daughter of Benjamin Clay, on 20 September 1762. They had fourteen children, several of whom died in infancy. Ann Ayrton died on 14 May 1800.

Because others believed it to be haunted, Ayrton was able to rent a large house, with a garden of three acres, for a low rent.

Ayrton died on 22 May 1808 at 24 James Street, Buckingham Gate, Westminster, and was buried, unmarked, in the north cloister of Westminster Abbey on 28 May. With him lie his wife, Ann, and five of their children who died in infancy.

== Ayrton family ==
The rise to prominence of Cllr. Edward Ayrton and his son Dr. Edmund Ayrton marks the beginning of a middle-class dynasty that endures to this day. Without entering the echelons of the British Establishment, winning knighthoods or peerages, they maintained a durable professional standing over several centuries, achieving prominence in various fields, particularly those with a creative dimension, such as music and art. The family is particularly associated with the cities of Ripon and, later, Chester, with leading members also gravitating to London.

The Ayrton family can be traced to the Ripon area since at least the time of the English Civil War. The father, grandfather and great-grandfather of the Mayor were all clerics in the district, as vicars of Nidd or South Stainley:

- Rev. Edward Ayrton (b. 1628)
- Rev. Edward Ayrton (1664-1734)
- Rev. Francis Ayrton

The Rev. Edward Ayrton (b. 1664) is presumably the same as the one designated a vicar choral at Ripon Minster, though that appointment was - perhaps confusingly - normally for laymen; he was an MA graduate. The Rev. Francis Ayrton taught at the city's Grammar School.

Edward Ayrton (1698-1774), the mayor of Ripon, had seven children. One of Edward's daughters married Nicholas Thomas Dall, the Danish painter.

William Ayrton (1726-1799) was Edward's eldest child and a brother of Edmund; he was baptised on 18 November 1726. He was organist of Ripon Minster from 7 June 1748 until his death on 2 February 1799. By his wife Catherine, who died at Chester on 19 September 1819, he had two sons, both of whom were organists at Ripon.

William Francis Morrell Ayrton (1778-1850) was the elder son and succeeded as organist on 25 June 1799, but moved to Chester soon after. He had previously served in the Chapel Royal, in London, where his uncle Dr. Edmund Ayrton was the Master. This William had an estate at Abbot's Grange, on the outskirts of the city and founded a branch of the family that also maintained its prominence. The city has since swallowed up the estate but a street-name commemorates its existence. William died in Chester on 8 November 1850, and his estate was inherited by his eldest son, William Francis Ayrton, co-founder of the firm of Ayrton & Groome. Among this William's ten children, by two marriages, were Randle Ayrton (1869-1940) and Maxwell Ayrton (1874-1960).

Nicholas T. D. Ayrton (1782-1822), known as Thomas Ayrton, was the younger son and followed his brother to become the third Ayrton in succession to be organist of Ripon Minster. He held the post for nearly twenty years before his death, on 24 October 1822, ended an unbroken family tenure of nearly seventy-five years.

== See also ==
Direct descendants:

- William Ayrton (1777-1858)
- Edward Ayrton (1882-1914)

Ayrtons of Cheshire, descended from Edmund's brother, William Ayrton (1726-1799):

- Randle Ayrton (1869-1940)
- Maxwell Ayrton (1874-1960)
- Tony Ayrton (1909-1943)
- Tessa Beaver (1932-2018)

Cultural offices
| Preceded by James Nares | Master of the Children of the Chapel Royal; 1780-1805 | Succeeded by John Stafford Smith |
