= William Newark =

English choirmaster and composer

William Newark (c. 1450–1509, sometimes spelt Newerk) was an English choirmaster and composer. He served at the Chapel Royal under five English kings.

== Rank and income ==
Newark was born in Newark-on-Trent about 1450. He was admitted in 1476 into the Fraternity of St Nicholas, a London-area organization of musicians, and appointed to the Gentlemen of the Chapel Royal in 1477, where he served until his death under five English kings (Edward IV, Edward V, Richard III, Henry VII and Henry VIII, see List of English Monarchs).

On 23 November 1480, Newark was confirmed in the benefice of St Mary's Priory, Thetford, granted to him in the previous year. He received a corrody from there, and also from the Abbey of St Benet of Hulme, Norfolk (from 1487) and Gloucester Abbey (from 1492).

Meanwhile, in 1485, Newark received a life grant of £20 from the King's manor at Bletchingley. In 1492, he was paid 20 shillings by the King "for making of a Song". In 1493, Henry VII formally appointed him Master of the Children of the Chapel Royal.

== Songs ==
At least seven songs of his have survived in the Fayrfax manuscript (BL, Add. MS 5465), an early 16th-century songbook associated with the households of Henry VII or his son Arthur, Prince of Wales. One of them, for two voices, "The farther I go, the more behynde," sets an early 15th-century rhyme royal stanza by Sir John Halsham (1357–1415).

== Death ==
Newark fell ill in the autumn of 1509 and died in the second week of November, some six months after his appointment as Master of the Children had been reconfirmed on the accession of King Henry VIII. He was buried in the porch of St Alfege Church, Greenwich.
