= William Hunnis =

English composer and poet (died 1597)

William Hunnis (died 6 June 1597) was an English Protestant poet, dramatist, and composer.

== Biography ==
Hunnis was as early as 1549 in the service of William Herbert, later Earl of Pembroke. His friend Thomas Newton, in a poem prefixed to The Hive of Hunnye (1578), says: "In prime of youth thy pleasant Penne depaincted Sonets sweete", and mentions his interludes, gallant lays, rondelets and songs, explaining that it was in the winter of his age that he turned to sacred lore and high philosophy.

In 1550 he published Certayne Psalms ... in Englishe metre, and shortly afterward was made a gentleman of the Chapel Royal to Edward VI. At Mary I's accession he retained his appointment, but in 1555 he is said to have been one of a party of twelve conspirators who had determined to take Mary's life.

Although nothing came of the first plot, shortly afterward he was party to the Dudley conspiracy to dethrone Mary in favour of her sister Elizabeth. Hunnis, having some knowledge of alchemy, was to go abroad to coin the necessary gold, but this doubtful mission was exchanged for the task of making false keys to the treasury in London, which he was able to do because of his friendship with Nicholas Brigham, the receiver of the exchequer. The conspirators were betrayed by one of their number, Thomas Whyte. Some were executed, and Hunnis was imprisoned.

The death of Mary made him a free man, and in 1559 he married Margaret, Brigham's widow, but she died within the year, and Hunnis married in 1560 the widow of a grocer. He himself became a grocer and freeman of the City of London, and supervisor of the Queen's Gardens at Greenwich. In 1566 he was made Master of the Children of the Chapel Royal. No complete piece of his is extant, perhaps because of the rule that the plays acted by the Children should not have been previously printed.

In his later years he purchased land at Barking, Essex. If the lines above his signature on a 1557 edition of Sir Thomas More's works are genuine, he remained a poor man, for he refuses to make a will on the ground that "the good that I shall leave, will not pay all I owe". In British Library Harley MS 6403 is a story that one of his sons, in the capacity of page, drank the remainder of the poisoned cup supposed to have been provided by Leicester for Walter Devereux, 1st Earl of Essex, but escaped with no injury beyond the loss of his hair.

== Works ==
Hunnis's extant works include:

- Certayne Psalms (1549),
- A Hive full of Hunnye (1578),
- Seven Sobbes of a sorrowful Soule for Sinne (1583),
- Hunnies Recreations (1588),
- sixteen poems in the Paradise of Dainty Devices (1576),
- and two in England's Helicon (1600).

His most famous musical compositions are found in a compilation, Seven Sobs of a Sorrowfull Soule for Sinne, which includes A Handful of Honisuckles. Those parts of the compilation which are musical are in a devotional style, and all his music in that collection consists of single-line tunes. Some of his work is for solo voice and viols, for example a setting of his own poem "In terrors trapp'd".

== Notes ==
Cultural offices
Preceded by Richard Edwards	Master of the Children of the Chapel Royal; 1566–1597	Succeeded by Nathaniel Giles
