= Richard Farrant =

English composer (c. 1525 – 1580)

Richard Farrant (c. 1525 – 30 November 1580) was an English composer, musical dramatist, theatre founder, and Master of the Children of the Chapel Royal. The first acknowledgment of him is in a list of the Gentlemen of the Chapel Royal in 1552. The year of his birth cannot be accurately determined. During his life he was able to establish himself as a successful composer, develop the English drama considerably, found the first Blackfriars Theatre, and be the first to write verse-anthems. He married Anne Bower, daughter of Richard Bower who was Master of the Chapel Royal choristers at the time. With Anne he conceived ten children, one of whom was also named Richard.

== Work with royalty ==
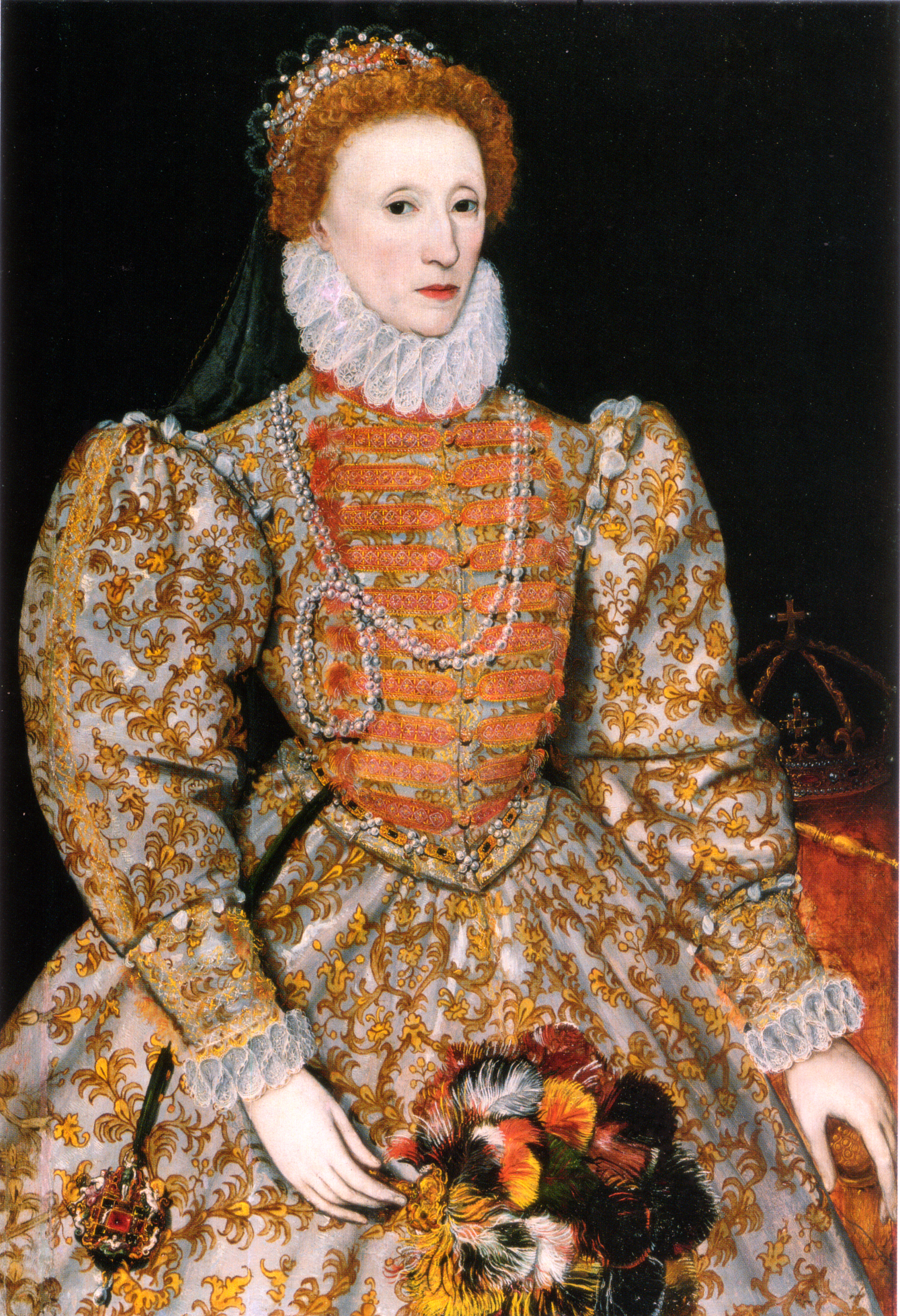
Queen Elizabeth I

As a member of the Gentlemen of the Chapel Royal, Farrant was active in ceremonies surrounding the royal family. He began his work with the Chapel Royal around 1550 under the reign of Edward VI. Fortunately, for Farrant, this is a time that saw huge developments in Latin church music. Composers like William Byrd and Christopher Tye were busy expanding and elaborating on the church music of the day. In Farrant's twelve years with the Chapel Royal, he was able to participate in funerals for Edward VI and Mary I, and coronations for Mary I and Elizabeth I. After his work there, he took up a post as lay vicar and organist at St. George's Chapel at Windsor.

== Postings ==
"to be Mr of ye queristers in this Xch. and to have a clerks place and to be one ofye organists in this chappell: hee to have the bording cloathing lodging and finding of ye 10 choristers: to enjoy ye houses and emoluments of an organist clerk and master. On condition of the premisses to have £81 6s 8d per ann. to be paid him monthly by ye treasurer besides spurre money and money given by strangers for singing of ballets and ye Mr of ye boyes is to have power of placeing and displaceing ye boyes ... he is also to find a sufficient service for those he displaces: hee to be absent so far as ye college statutes permit"

— Farrant's indenture appointing him to Windsor, 24 April 1564

For Farrant, the post at Windsor became a permanent one that he retained for the rest of his life. Along with this, he also acquired the position of Master of the Chapel Royal choristers in November 1569. Having the choirs of both of these institutions at his disposal gave him an outlet to showcase all of his compositions and plays. In fact, every winter he was able to produce a play for the queen herself. These positions also allowed him to move back to London in 1576 and begin a public theatre of sorts where he rehearsed some of his choir music openly. It was soon after, in 1580, that he died, having left his house to his wife.

== Important contributions ==
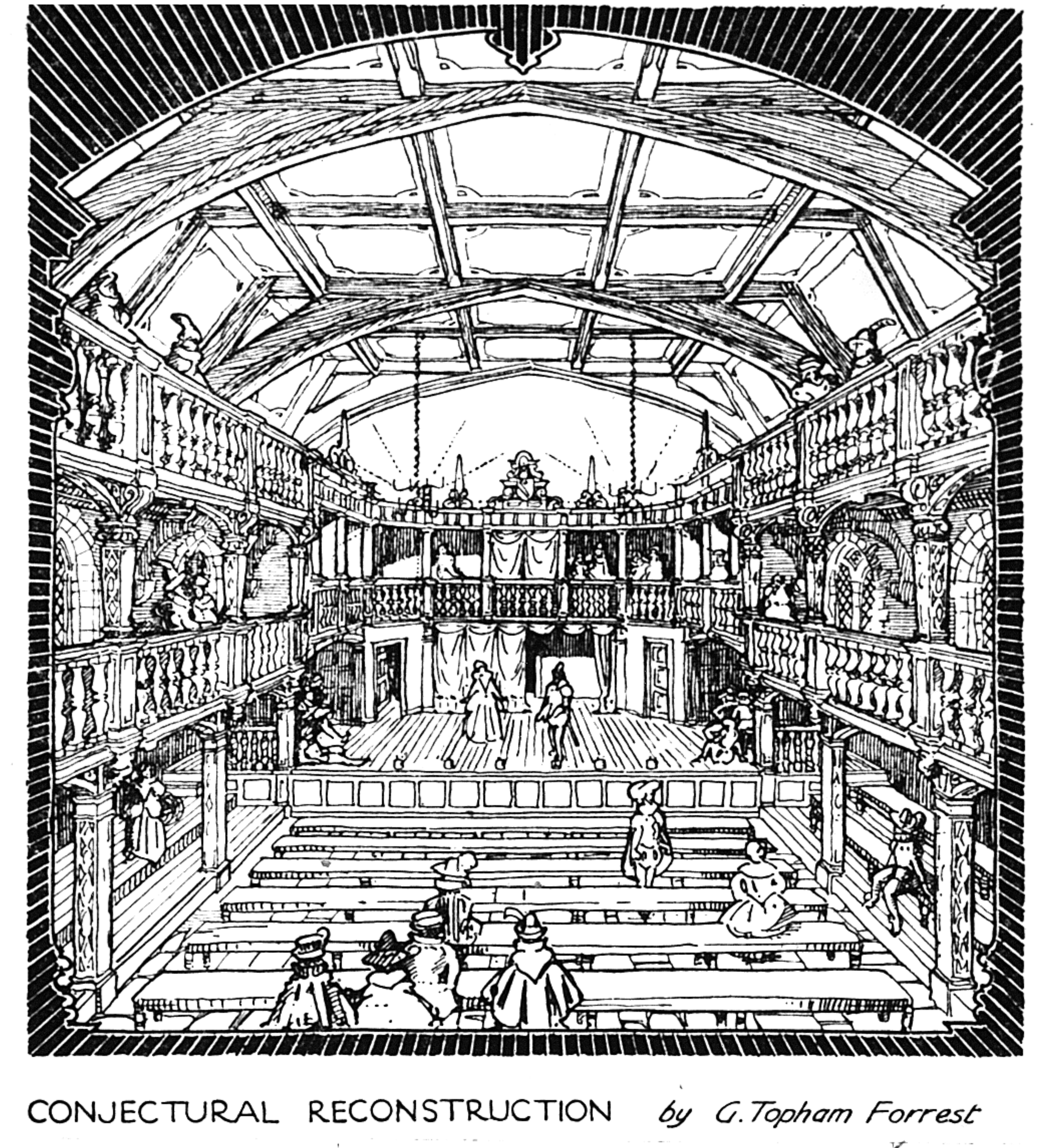
Conjectural reconstruction of the second Blackfriars Theatre

Unlike many composers of his day, who stuck to only music composition, Farrant also wrote many plays. One of his most important contributions to drama in England is the creation of the first Blackfriars Theatre. This eventually became one of the most important places in London for drama to develop during the Renaissance. Farrant is also one of the earliest and most well-known composers who began to mix the two mediums of music and drama. It was this uncommon mixture that allowed him to begin to develop the composition style of 'verse.' This becomes prominent in a lot of his pieces including the anthems When as we sat in Babylon, Call to remembrance and Hide not thou thy face.

== Works ==
Because of the time gap, many of Farrant's works are only known because of careful documentation or brief mention from other documents.

=== Compositions ===
- Ah, alas, You Salt Sea Gods (included in the Dow Partbooks)
- Call to Remembrance (based on Psalm 25) (also attributed to John Hilton the Elder)
- Hide Not Thou Thy Face
- Lord, for Thy Tender Mercy's Sake (also attributed to John Hilton the Elder)
- Magnificat & Nunc Dimittis
- O Jove, from Stately Throne
- O Sacrum Convivium
- Single Chant in F Major
- Felix Namque
- Voluntarye

=== Dramatic works ===
- Ajax and Ulysses
- Quintus Fabius
- The History of Mutius Scevola
- Xerxes
- The History of Loyaltie and Bewtie
- The History of Alucius
- Orestes
- Panthea and Abradatas
