= Anglican church music =

Music genre

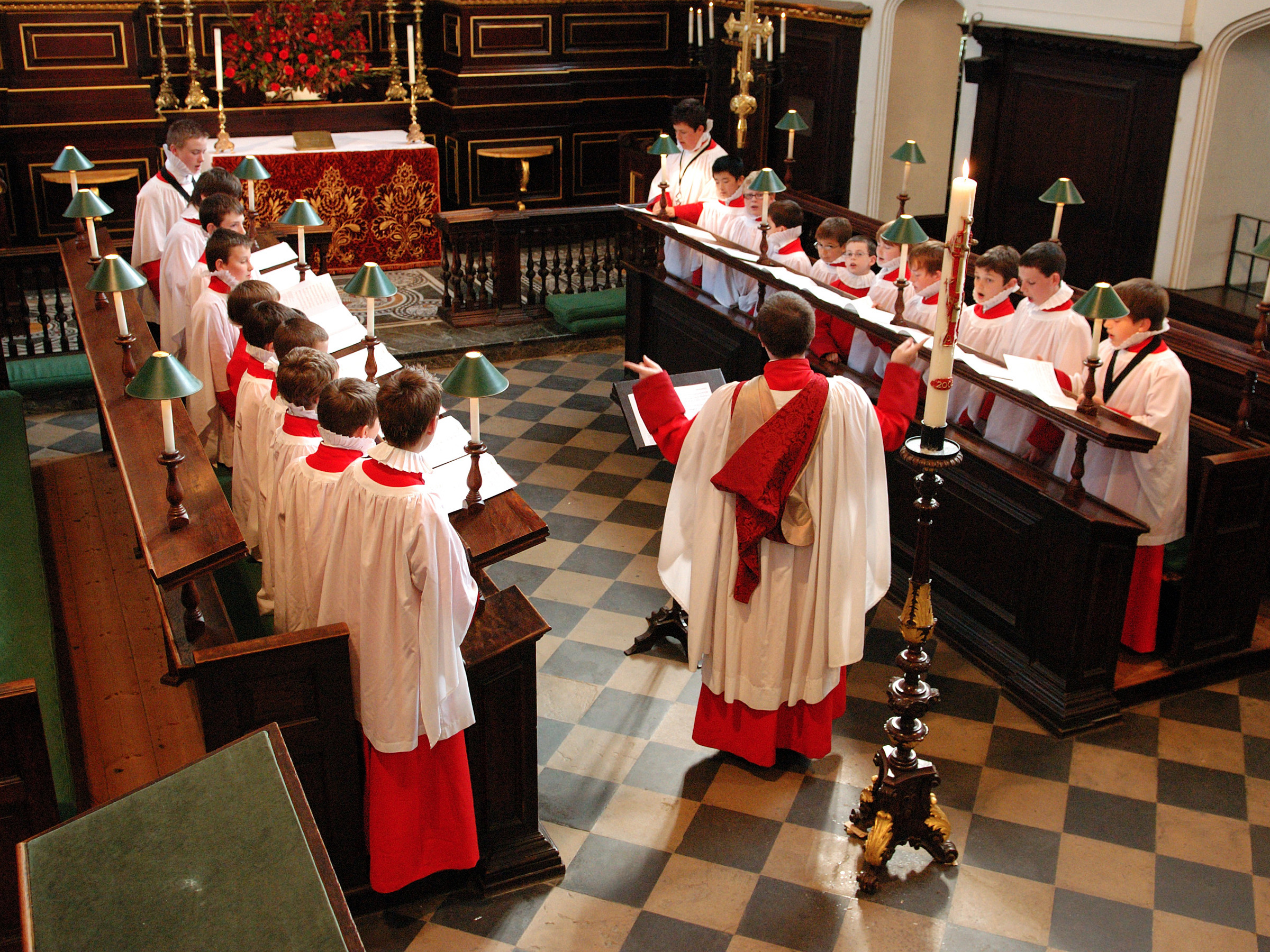
A parish church choir at All Saints' Church, Northampton; singers wear traditional cassock, surplice and ruff and stand in facing rows of Decani and Cantoris in the choir stalls

Anglican church music is music that is written for Christian worship in Anglican religious services, forming part of the liturgy. It mostly consists of pieces written to be sung by a church choir, which may sing a cappella or accompanied by an organ.

Anglican music forms an important part of traditional worship not only in the Church of England, but also in the Scottish Episcopal Church, the Church in Wales, the Church of Ireland, the Episcopal Church in the United States of America, the Anglican Church of Canada, the Anglican Church in Aotearoa, New Zealand and Polynesia, the Anglican Church of Australia and other Christian denominations which identify as Anglican. It can also be used at the Personal Ordinariates of the Roman Catholic Church.

== Forms ==
The chief musical forms in Anglican church music are centred around the forms of worship defined in the liturgy.

=== Service settings ===
Mass Setting
The "Kyrie Eleison" from William Byrd's Mass for Four Voices

Service settings are choral settings of the words of the liturgy. These include:

The Ordinary of the Eucharist
Sung Eucharist is a musical setting of the service of Holy Communion. Naming conventions may vary according to the churchmanship of the place of worship; in churches that tend towards a low church or broad church style of worship, the terms Eucharist or Communion are common, while in high church worship, the more Catholic term Mass may be used. Musical pieces corresponding to the liturgical pattern of the Ordinary of the Mass (Kyrie, Gloria, Credo, Sanctus & Benedictus, Agnus Dei) may be sung by the choir or congregation. Many English-language settings of the communion service have been written, such as those by Herbert Howells and Harold Darke; simpler settings suitable for congregational singing are also used, such as the services by John Merbecke or Martin Shaw. In high church worship, Latin Mass settings are often preferred, such as those by William Byrd.

Morning Service
The Anglican service of morning prayer, known as Mattins, is a peculiarly Anglican service which originated in 1552 as an amalgam of the monastic offices of Matins, Lauds and Prime in Thomas Cranmer’s Second Prayer Book of Edward VI. Choral settings of the Morning Service may include the opening preces and responses (see below), the Venite, and the morning canticles of Te Deum, Benedicite, Benedictus, Jubilate and a Kyrie.

Evening Service

Evening Service Setting
The Magnificat from the Evening Service in A by Stanford

Evening Prayer, also known as Evensong, consists of preces and responses, Psalms, canticles, hymns and an anthem (see below). The evening canticles are the Magnificat and the Nunc Dimittis, and these texts have been set to music by many composers. Herbert Howells alone composed 20 settings of the canticles, including his Collegium Regale (1944) and St Paul's (1950) services. Like Mattins, Evensong is a service that is a distinctively Anglican service, originating in the Book of Common Prayer of 1549 as a combination of the offices of Vespers and Compline. Choral Evensong is sung daily in most Church of England cathedrals, as well as in churches and cathedrals throughout the Anglican Communion. It is noted for its particular appeal to worshippers and visitors, attracting both believers and atheists with its meditative quality and cultural value. A service of Choral Evensong is broadcast weekly on BBC Radio 3, a tradition begun in 1926.

=== Preces and responses ===
Preces & responses
The preces & responses by William Smith of Durham

The Preces (or versicles) and responses are a set of prayers from the Book of Common Prayer for both Morning and Evening Prayer. They may be sung antiphonally by the priest (or a lay cantor) and choir. There are a number of popular choral settings by composers such as William Smith or Bernard Rose; alternatively, they may be sung as plainsong with a congregation.

=== Psalms ===
Anglican chant
A setting of Psalm 84 by Hubert Parry

Morning and Evening Prayer (and sometimes Holy Communion) include a Psalm or Psalms, chosen according to the lectionary of the day. This may be sung by the choir or congregation, either to plainsong, or to a distinctive type of chant known as Anglican chant by the choir or congregation.

=== Anthems or motets ===
God So Loved the World
The popular anthem, God So Loved the World, from Stainer's Crucifixion

Part-way through a service of worship, a choir may sing an anthem or motet, a standalone piece of sacred choral music, which is not part of the liturgy but is usually chosen to reflect to the liturgical theme of the day.

=== Hymns ===
The singing of hymns is a common feature of Anglican worship and usually includes congregational singing as well as a choir. An Introit hymn is sung at the start of a service, a Gradual hymn precedes the Gospel, an Offertory hymn is sung during the Offertory and a recessional hymn at the close of a service.

=== Organ voluntary ===
A piece for organ, known as a voluntary, is often played at the end of a service after the recessional hymn and dismissal.

== Performance ==
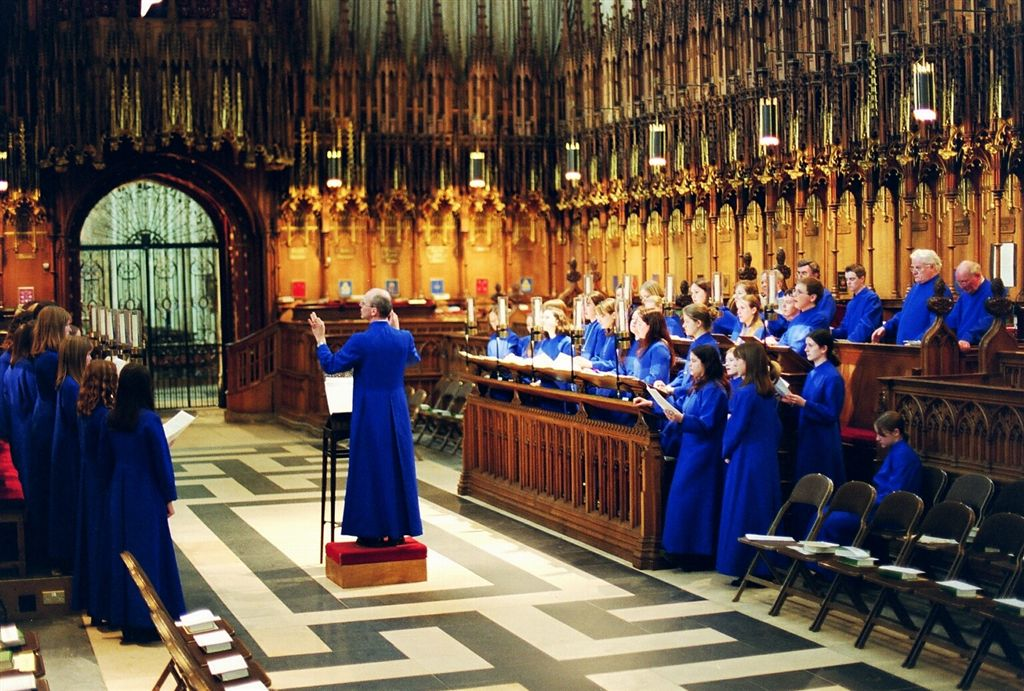
A choir singing choral evensong in York Minster

Almost all Anglican church music is written for choir with or without organ accompaniment. Adult singers in a cathedral choir are often referred to as lay clerks, while children may be referred to as choristers or trebles. In certain places of worship, such as Winchester College in England, the more archaic spelling quirister is used.

An Anglican choir typically uses "SATB" voices (soprano or treble, alto or counter-tenor, tenor, and bass), though in many works some or all of these voices are divided into two for part or all of the piece; in this case the two halves of the choir (one on each side of the aisle) are traditionally named decani and cantoris which sing, respectively, Choir 1 and Choir 2 in two-choir music. There may also be soloists, usually only for part of the piece. There are also works for fewer voices, such as those written for solely men's voices or boys'/women's voices.

== Vestments ==
At traditional Anglican choral services, a choir is vested, i.e. clothed in special ceremonial vestments. These are normally a cassock, a long, full-length robe which may be purple, red or black in colour, over which is worn a surplice, a knee-length white cotton robe. Normally a surplice is only worn during a service of worship, so a choir often rehearses wearing cassocks only. Younger choristers who have newly joined a choir begin to wear a surplice after an initial probationary period. Cassocks originated in the medieval period as day dress for clergy, but later came into liturgical use. Additionally, junior choristers may wear a ruff, an archaic form of dress collar, although this tradition is becoming less common. In some establishments, including the Choir of King's College, Cambridge, Eton collars are worn. Whist singing the offices, adult choir members may also wear an academic hood over their robes. In England, young choristers who have attained a certain level of proficiency with the Royal School of Church Music, an international educational organisation that promotes liturgical music, may wear an RSCM medallion.

== History ==
Prior to the Reformation, music in British churches and cathedrals consisted mainly of Gregorian chant and polyphonic settings of the Latin Mass. The Anglican church did not exist as such, but the foundations of Anglican music were laid with music from the Catholic liturgy. The earliest surviving examples of European polyphony are found in the Winchester Tropers, a manuscript collection of liturgical choral music used at Winchester Cathedral, dating from the early-eleventh to mid-twelfth centuries. By the time of King Henry V in the fifteenth century, the music in English cathedrals, monasteries and collegiate churches had developed a distinctive and influential style known in Western Europe as the contenance angloise, whose chief proponent was the composer John Dunstable.

The intense Marian tradition led to the Tudor votive style of polyphony developing at the end of the 15th century, characterised by high treble lines and long solo verses with melisma. Antiphons were usually performed at the end of the liturgical day after compline. The largest collection of the style is the late-15th-century Eton Choirbook. By 1500, canticles, antiphons and Lady Masses were composed with up to nine parts in the texture, and vocal ranges and melodic complexity increased,

Characteristics of the votive style, such as elaborate voice lines and melisma, began to be supplanted by more succinct continental traditions by the 1530s. Apart from a brief but strong revival in the 1550s with the reign of Queen Mary, the votive style died out due to its complexity, scale and devotional subject coming to odds with the ideals of the Edwardian and Elizabethan reformations. Nevertheless, the Tudor votive style had enduring influence in the Anglican church: choristers and lay clerks often face each other antiphonally, placed in the quire's Decani and Cantoris, just as they did in the late Plantagenet and early Tudor periods.

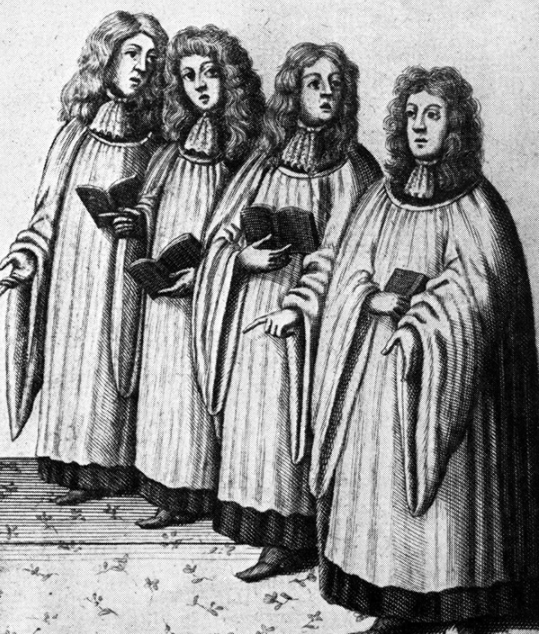
Four members of the Westminster Abbey Choir at the Coronation of James II in 1685.

In the early 1530s, the break with Rome under King Henry VIII set in motion the separation of the Church of England from the Roman Catholic Church and the Reformation in England. The Church of England's Latin liturgy was replaced with scripture and prayers in English; the Great Bible in English was authorised in 1539 and Thomas Cranmer introduced the Book of Common Prayer in 1549. These changes were reflected in church music, and votive works that had previously been sung in Latin began to be replaced with new Christocentric anthems in English. This gave rise to an era of great creativity during the Tudor period, in which composition of music for Anglican worship flourished. Former late proponents of the votive style such as John Sheppard, Robert White and Thomas Tallis began composing in a more modern, imitative style of polyphony closer to that of the late period, such as in the Roman School. The defining characteristic of music in the reformed Church of England was one-syllable-one-note, according to the 1559 injunctions. However, a more elaborate piece was permitted at certain times of the day, allowing Chapel Royal composers to continue writing and performing polyphonic Latin motets, such as Tallis' O nata lux, alongside the simple English anthems.

Following the events of the English Civil War and the execution of King Charles I, Puritan influences took hold in the Church of England. Anglican church music became simpler in style, and services typically focused on morning and evening prayer. During the Restoration period, musical practices of the Baroque era found their way into Anglican worship, and stringed or brass instruments sometimes accompanied choirs. In the late 17th century, the composer Henry Purcell, who served as organist of both the Chapel Royal and Westminster Abbey, wrote many choral anthems and service settings. During the Georgian era, the music of George Frideric Handel was highly significant, with his repertoire of anthems, canticles and hymns, although he never held a church post.

Up until the early 19th century, most Anglican church music in England was centred around the cathedrals, where trained choirs would sing choral pieces in worship. Composers wrote music to make full use of the traditional cathedral layout of a segregated chancel area and the arrangement of choir stalls into rows of Decani and Cantoris, writing antiphonal anthems.

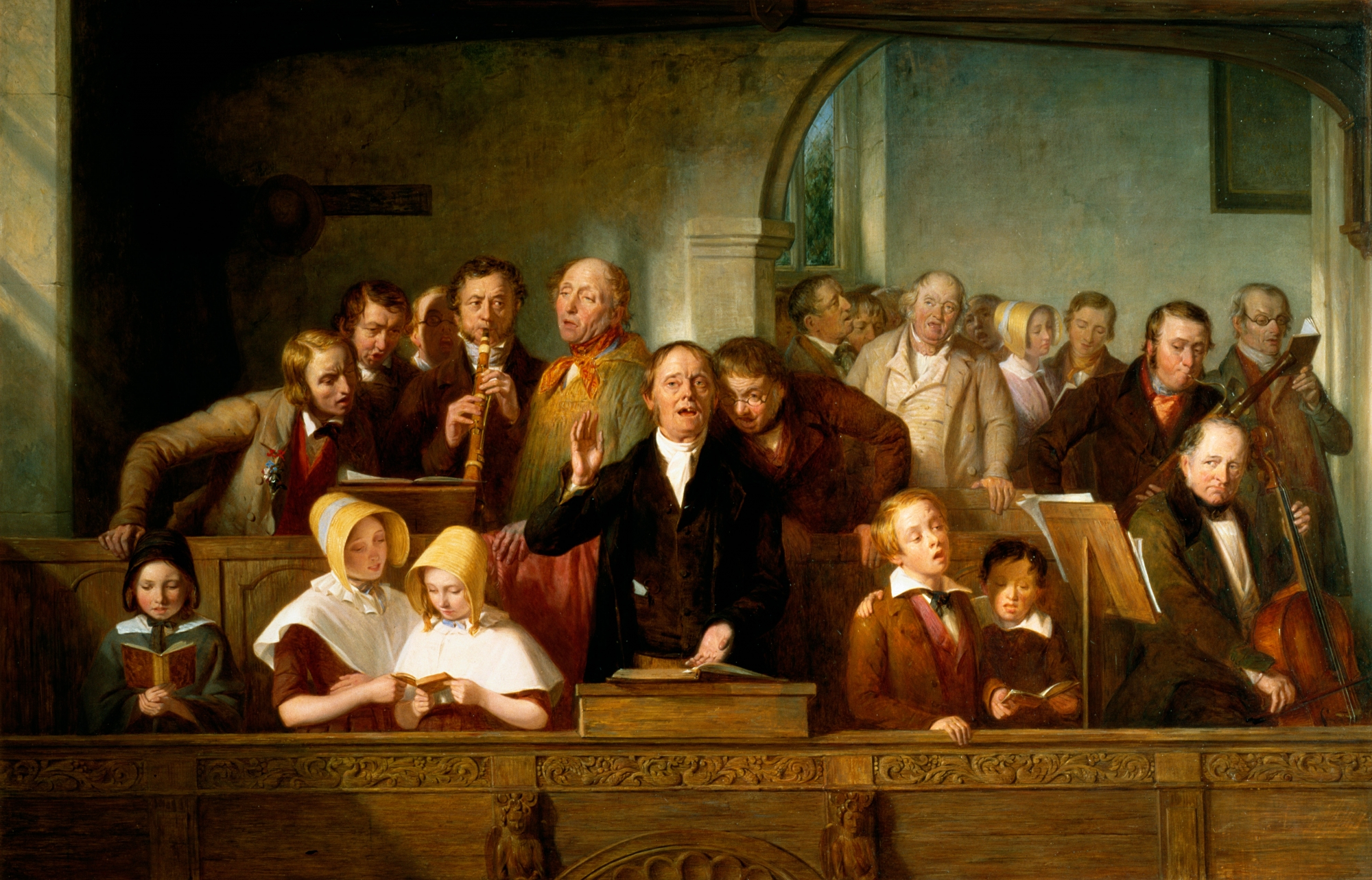
A Village Choir, an 1847 painting by Thomas Webster, showing the musicians of a country parish church at that time.

In parish churches, musical worship was limited to congregational singing of metrical psalms, often led by a largely untrained choir. A great quantity of simple tunes were published in the 18th and early 19th century for their use. From the mid-18th century, accompaniment began to be provided by a "parish band" of instruments such as the violin, cello, clarinet, flute and bassoon. These musicians would often sit in a gallery at the west end of the church, giving rise to the later term, "west gallery music".

The tradition of a robed choir of men and boys was virtually unknown in Anglican parish churches until the early 19th century. Around 1839, a choral revival took hold in England, partially fuelled by the Oxford Movement, which sought to revive Catholic liturgical practice in Anglican churches. Despite opposition from more Puritan-minded Anglicans, ancient practices such as intoning the versicles and responses and chanted Psalms were introduced. The 16th century setting by John Merbecke for the Communion Service was revived in the 1840s and was almost universally adopted in parish churches. Composers active around this time included Samuel Sebastian Wesley and Charles Villiers Stanford. A number of grandiose settings of the Anglican morning and evening canticles for choir and organ were composed in the late 19th and early 20th century, including settings by Thomas Attwood Walmisley, Charles Wood, Thomas Tertius Noble, Basil Harwood and George Dyson, works which remain part of the Anglican choral repertoire today.

The singing of hymns was popularised within Anglicanism by the evangelical Methodist movement of the mid-18th century, but hymns, as opposed to metrical psalms, were not officially sanctioned as an integral part of Anglican Orders of Service until the early nineteenth century. From about 1800 parish churches started to use different hymn collections in informal service like the Lock Hospital Collection (1769) by Martin Madan, the Olney hymns (1779) by John Newton and William Cowper and A Collection of Hymns for the Use of The People Called Methodists(Wesley 1779) (1779) by John Wesley and Charles Wesley. In 1820, the parishioners of a church in Sheffield took their parish priest to court when he tried to introduce hymns into Sunday worship; the judgement was ambiguous, but the matter was settled in the same year by Vernon Harcourt, the Archbishop of York, who sanctioned their use at services. Anglican hymnody was revitalised by the Oxford Movement and led to the publication hymnals such as Hymns Ancient and Modern (1861). The English Hymnal, edited by Percy Dearmer and Ralph Vaughan Williams, was published in 1906, and became one of the most influential hymn books ever published. It was supplanted in 1986 by the New English Hymnal.

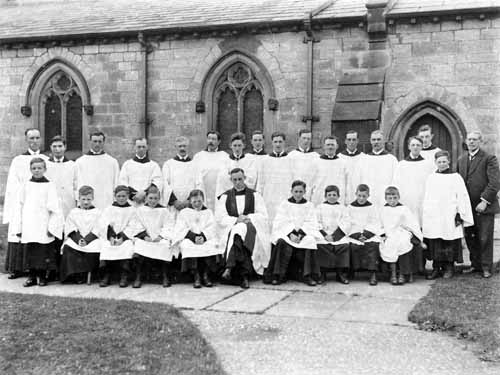
The choir at Aberford, near Leeds, West Yorkshire, in the early 20th century.

The acceptance of hymns in Anglican liturgy led to the adoption of the folk tradition of Christmas carol singing during the 19th century, the popularity of which was enhanced by Albert, Prince Consort teaching German carols to the royal family. The Festival of Nine Lessons and Carols originated at Truro Cathedral in 1888 as a means of attracting people away from pubs on Christmas Eve; a revised version was adopted at King's College, Cambridge, first broadcast on BBC radio in 1928 and has now become an annual tradition, transmitted around the world. This has done much to popularise church music, as well as published collections such as Oxford Book of Carols (1928) and Carols for Choirs. Following the early music revival of the mid-20th century, the publication of collections such as the Oxford Book of Tudor Anthems encouraged renewed interest in 17th-century composers such as Byrd and Tallis.

In all but the smallest churches the congregation was until recently confined to the singing of hymns. Over the past half century or so efforts have been made to increase the role of the congregation and also to introduce more "popular" musical styles in the evangelical and charismatic leaning congregations. Not all churches can boast a full SATB choir, and a repertoire of one-, two- and three-part music is more suitable for many parish church choirs, a fact which is recognised in the current work of the Royal School of Church Music.

Anglican churches also frequently draw upon the musical traditions of other Christian denominations. Works by Catholic composers such as Mozart, Lutherans such as Bach, Calvinists like Mendelssohn, and composers from other branches of Christianity are often featured. This is particularly the case in music for the Mass in Anglo-Catholic churches, much of which is taken from the work of Roman Catholic composers.

Traditionally, Anglican choirs were exclusively male, due to a belief that girls' voices produced a different sound. However, recent research has shown that given the same training, the voices of girls and boys cannot be told apart, save for an interval from the C above middle C to the F above that. Salisbury Cathedral started a girls' choir in 1991 and others have since followed suit. There has been some concern that having mixed choirs in parish churches leads to fewer boys being willing to participate.

== See also ==
- Plainsong and Medieval Music Society
- Change ringing
- List of Anglican church composers
- West gallery music
- Chapel Royal
- Royal School of Church Music
- Church music in Scotland
- Category:Catholic music
- Hymnody in the Anglosphere (article in German)
