= Anglican chant =

Form of church singing

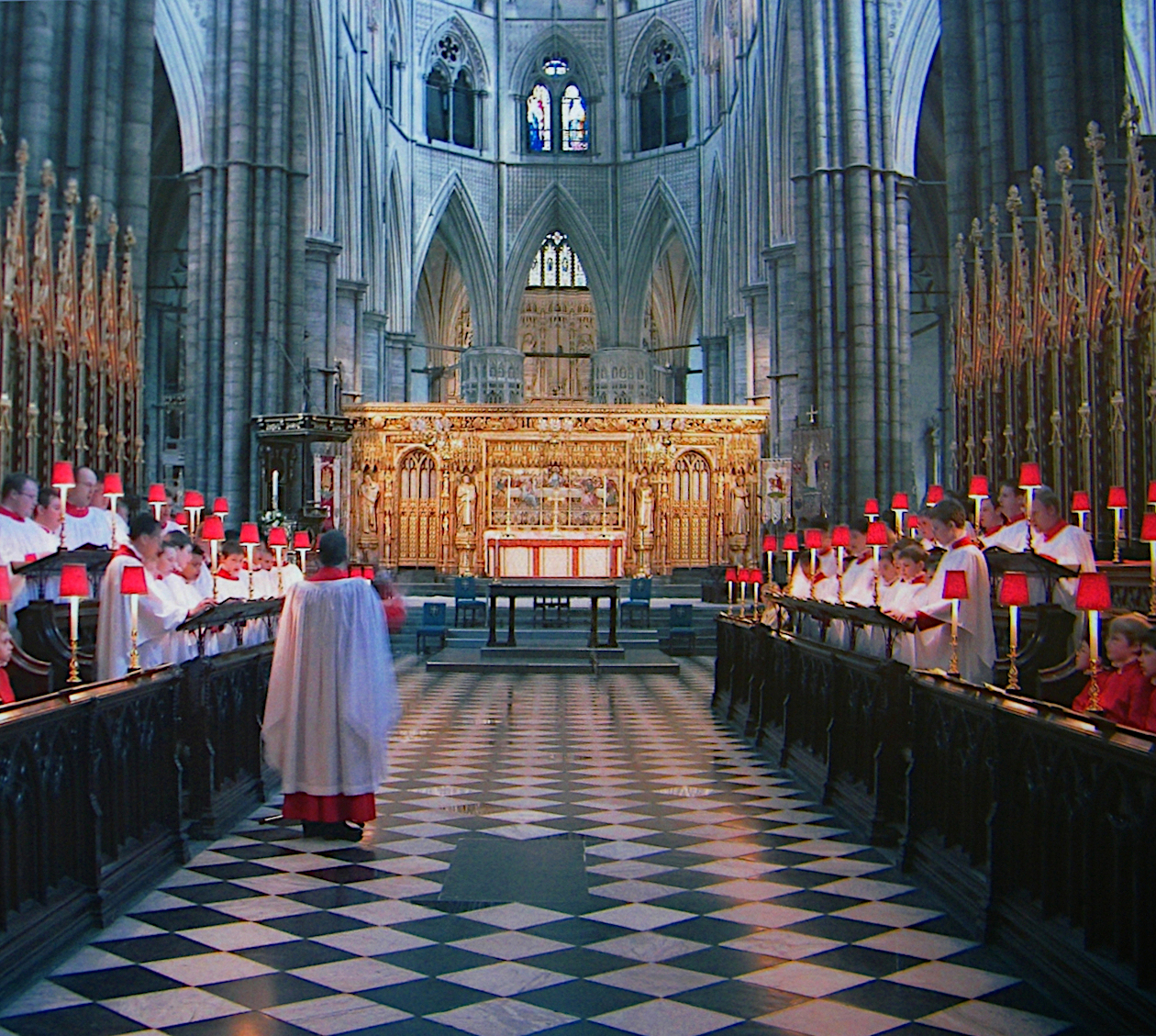
Anglican chant is often sung by church and cathedral choirs such as Westminster Abbey choir Psalm 84 A setting of Psalm 84 by Hubert Parry, sung by the choir of Trinity Church, Boston

Anglican chant, also known as English chant, is a way to sing unmetrical texts, including psalms and canticles from the Bible, by matching the natural speech-rhythm of the words to the notes of a simple harmonized melody. This distinctive type of chant is a significant element of Anglican church music.

Anglican chant was formerly in widespread use in Anglican and Episcopal churches, but today, Anglican chant is sung primarily in Anglican cathedrals, collegiate churches, and parish churches that have retained a choral liturgical tradition. Additionally, Anglican chant may be sung in Roman Catholic, Lutheran, Presbyterian, and Reformed churches.

Anglican chant grew out of the plainchant tradition during the English Reformation. When singing a text in Anglican chant, the natural rhythm of the words as they would be spoken by a careful speaker governs how the music is fitted to the words. The majority of the words are freely and rhythmically chanted over the reciting notes, which are found in the first, fourth, eighth, eleventh (etc.) bars of the chant and with the other notes of the music appropriately fitted to the words at the end of each half-verse. Formerly the rhythm of the non-reciting notes was strictly observed, but nowadays the rhythm is based on the natural cadence of speech. Thus, the length of each of these notes bears little relation to the normal musical value of a note such as a minim or semibreve.

Anglican chant was well established by the 18th century. The earliest known examples are single chants written by John Blow, Henry Purcell, and their contemporaries. Earlier examples by Tudor composers such as Tallis, Farrant, and others are not original. The earliest double chants are from about 1700.

== Method ==
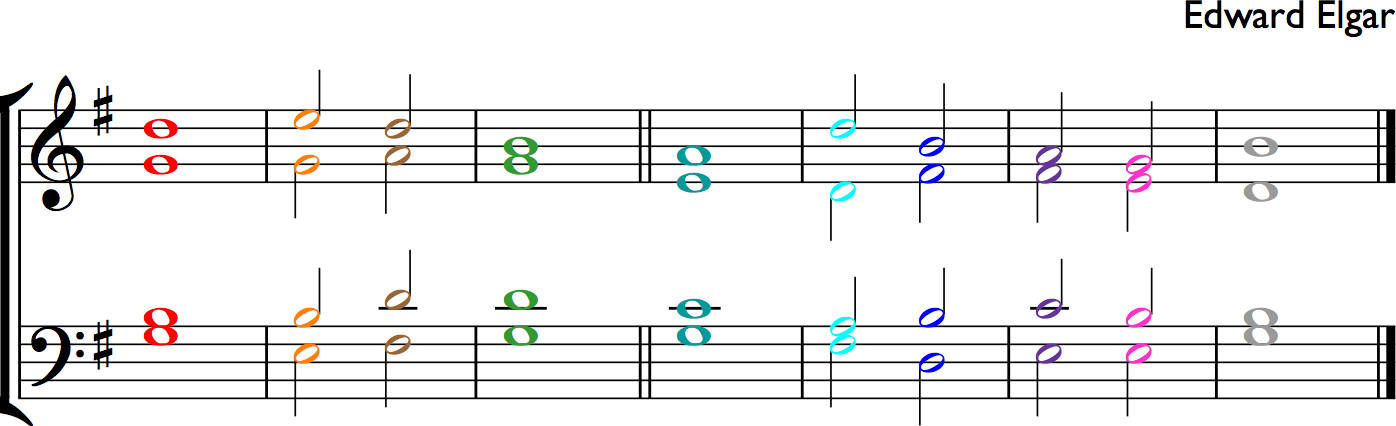
An Anglican chant with the chords in different colours

The text is pointed for chanting by assigning each verse or phrase to a simple harmonised melody of 7, 14, 21 or 28 bars (known respectively as a single, double, triple or quadruple chant).

An example of a single chant is shown above. Below are the first four verses of the Magnificat, with the text coloured and numbered to show which words correspond to which notes in the music ("the chant"); the apostrophes can be seen to correspond to bar-lines, and the colon to the double bar-line:

1. ^{1}My soul doth ' ^{2}magnify ^{3}the ' ^{4}Lord : ^{5}And my spirit hath re-'^{6}joiced ^{7}in ' ^{8}God ^{9}my ' ^{10}Saviour.
2. ^{1}For ' ^{1}he hath ^{3}re-'^{4}garded : ^{5}the ' ^{6}lowli-^{7}ness ' ^{8}of ^{9}his ' ^{10}handmaiden.
3. ^{1}For be-'^{1}hold ^{3}from ' ^{4}henceforth : ^{5}all gene- ' ^{6}rations ^{7}shall ' ^{8}call ^{9}me ' ^{10}blessed.
4. ^{1}For he that is mighty hath ' ^{1}magni-^{3}fied ' ^{4}me : ^{5}and ' ^{6}ho-^{7}ly ' ^{8}is ^{9}his ' ^{10}Name.

Various psalters have been published over the years, with each one showing how the chant is to be fitted to the words and each having its own variation on the precise rules for doing so. The rules used in the Parish Psalter (one of the more popular psalters, edited by Sydney Nicholson) are as follows:

- Each verse is sung to seven bars of music (the whole chant in the example above, though most chants are 14 bars = 2 verses long)
- The bar lines in the music correspond to the "pointing marks" which are shown above as inverted commas or apostrophes in the text.
- The double bar line in the music corresponds to the colon in the text.
- Where there is one note (a semibreve) to a bar, all the words for the corresponding part of the text are sung to that one note.
- Where there are two notes (two minims) to a bar, unless indicated otherwise all the words except the last syllable are sung to the first minim. The final syllable is sung to the second minim. Where more than the last syllable is to be sung to the second minim, a dot (·) (between words) or a hyphen (within a word) is used in the text to indicate where the note change should occur.

Other psalters use different notation; modern psalters such as the New St Paul's Cathedral Psalter (John Scott, 1997) have adopted the following convention:

- A vertical bar (|) is used to indicate a barline.
- Whenever there are 3 or more syllables in a bar containing two minims, a dot (·) or hyphen is used, even if the change of note is on the final syllable.

There are various additional rules which apply occasionally:

- Some chants have more complicated rhythms than the example above, generally in the form of a dotted minim and a crotchet (in any bar except the last of a quarter) or of two crotchets taking the place of a minim.
- When a minim in an internal bar (i.e. not the first or last bar of a quarter) is replaced by two crotchets, one of two things happens. If there is only one syllable, both notes are sung to it in quick succession. If there are two (or occasionally more) syllables, they are split as appropriate to smoothly match the rhythm of the words to the two notes.
- When an internal bar has a dotted rhythm, it is to be sung as above, excepting that the crotchet can be omitted from the music if the natural rhythm of the words and the sentiment of the words indicate that it is appropriate to do so.
- When the first bar of a quarter has a dotted minim and a crotchet, all syllables except the last are sung to the note of the dotted minim, with the crotchet being tucked in on the last syllable before the barline. If there is only one syllable, both notes are sung to it in quick succession with the subtle emphasis being on the first note.
- Sometimes the last bar of a quarter has two minims instead of the usual semibreve, in which case a dot/hyphen may be required after the last barline in the text: (e.g. even as ' though they ' were mine ' ene-mies.)
- Particularly in long psalms, changes of chant may be used to signal thematic shifts in the words. Psalm 119, which is the longest in the psalter, is generally sung with a change of chant after every 8 of its 176 verses, corresponding to the 22 stanzas of the original Hebrew text. However, it is never sung all at once, but spread over successive days.

== Double, triple and quadruple chants ==
The example above is a single chant. This is mostly only used for very short psalms (half a dozen verses or so).

The most commonly used chants are double chants. These are twice the length of a single chant. The music of the chant is repeated for every pair of verses. This reflects the structure of the Hebrew poetry of many of the psalms: Each verse is in two halves – the second half answers the first; the verses are in pairs – the second verse answers the first.

Triple and quadruple chants are considerably rarer. They appeared from the latter part of the 19th century to cover some of the exceptions to this format. They set the verses of the psalm in groups of three or four verses respectively. Psalm 2 (for example) is suited to a triple chant; a quadruple chant might be used for Psalm 78.

A double chant is divided into "quarters", each of which has the music for half a verse. Triple and quadruple chants may also be described as containing six or eight quarters.

If the entire text (or a section of it) has an odd number of verses, the second half of the chant is usually repeated at an appropriate point, which may be marked "2nd part". Similarly, "3rd part" markings may be used for triple chants.

An example of a double chant:

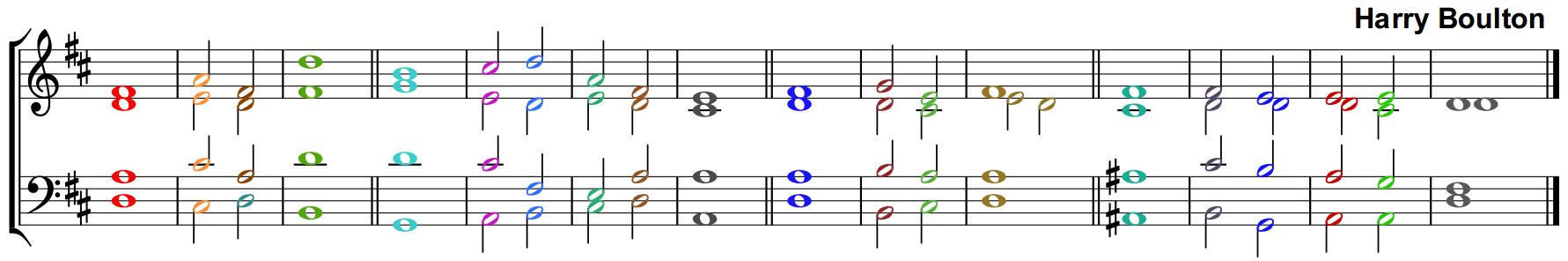
A double Anglican Chant with the chords in different colours

Below are the four lines of the doxology Gloria Patri (commonly known as the "Gloria"), with the text coloured and numbered to show which words correspond to which notes in the music ("the chant"); the apostrophes can be seen to correspond to bar-lines, and the colon to the double bar-line (pointing may vary from choir to choir):

^{1}Glory be to the Father, and ' ^{2}to ^{3}the ' ^{4}Son :
^{5}and ' ^{6}to ^{7}the ' ^{8}Ho-^{9}ly ' ^{10}Ghost;
^{11}As it was in the beginning, is now, and ' ^{12}ev-^{13}er ' ^{14}shall ^{14a}be :
^{15}world without ' ^{16}end ^{17}A ' ^{18}- ^{19}- ' ^{20}men.

The doxology Gloria Patri, usually sung at the end of a psalm or canticle, is two verses long. Depending on the type of chant, it is sung in one of the following ways:

- to a single chant sung twice,
- to a double chant,
- to an appropriate 14 bars (usually specified by the composer) of a triple chant or quadruple chant.

== Accompaniment ==
Psalms may be sung unaccompanied or accompanied by an organ or other instrument. Organists use a variety of registrations to mirror the changing mood of the words from verse to verse; but the organ should never be so loud that the words cannot be clearly heard. Organists may sometimes utilize word painting, using effects such as a deep pedal note on the word "thunder", or a harsh reed tone for "darkness" contrasting with a mixture for "light".

== Antiphonal singing ==
A further stylistic technique is used in cathedrals and churches which use an antiphonal style of singing. In this case, the choir is divided into two equal half-choirs, each having representation for the four musical parts, and usually facing one another. They are typically named Decani (usually the half-choir to the south side) and Cantoris (usually the half-choir to the north side). Then the choir may employ either of the techniques known as quarter-chanting and half-chanting. In quarter-chanting (which is more true to the structure of the Hebrew poetry), the side that starts (usually decani) sing the first quarter of the chant (and thus the first half of the verse). The side that did not start (usually cantoris) then sing the second quarter of the chant (and thus the second half of the verse). This sequence then repeats. In half-chanting (which is more true to antiphonal singing in the Gregorian style), decani sing the first two quarters of the chant, and cantoris the next two quarters (so that each half-choir sings a whole verse at a time).

With antiphonal singing, the first two verses, the Gloria and perhaps the last two verses are often sung by the whole choir.

A few choirs elaborate further, e.g. by having some verses sung by soloists, trebles only, alto/tenor/bass only (with the treble line transferred into one of the other parts) or one part or soloists singing the melody while the rest of the choir hums. Occasionally some or all trebles may sing a descant; this usually happens only in the final verse of the psalm or the Gloria.

== See also ==
- Anglican church music
- Gregorian chant
- Plainsong
- List of Anglican church composers
