= Clucas =

Clucas is a surname of Manx origin, derived from "Mac Lucas", meaning "son of Luke". It may refer to:

- Ben Clucas (born 1984), British racing driver
- Flo Clucas (born 1947), English local politician
- George Frederick Clucas (1870–1937), Manx politician
- Humphrey Clucas (born 1941), British composer
- Sir Kenneth Clucas (1921–2010), English civil servant
- Matthew Clucas (born 1978), Australian rules footballer
- Sam Clucas (born 1990), English footballer
- Seanan Clucas (born 1990), Northern Irish footballer
