= Richard Ayleward =

English composer (1626–1669)

Richard Ayleward (1626 – 15 October 1669) was an English composer and musician. He is noted for his contribution to the repertoire of Anglican church music.

== Early life ==
Ayleward was born the son of a minor canon at Winchester Cathedral. There he sang as a chorister in the cathedral choir.

== Career ==
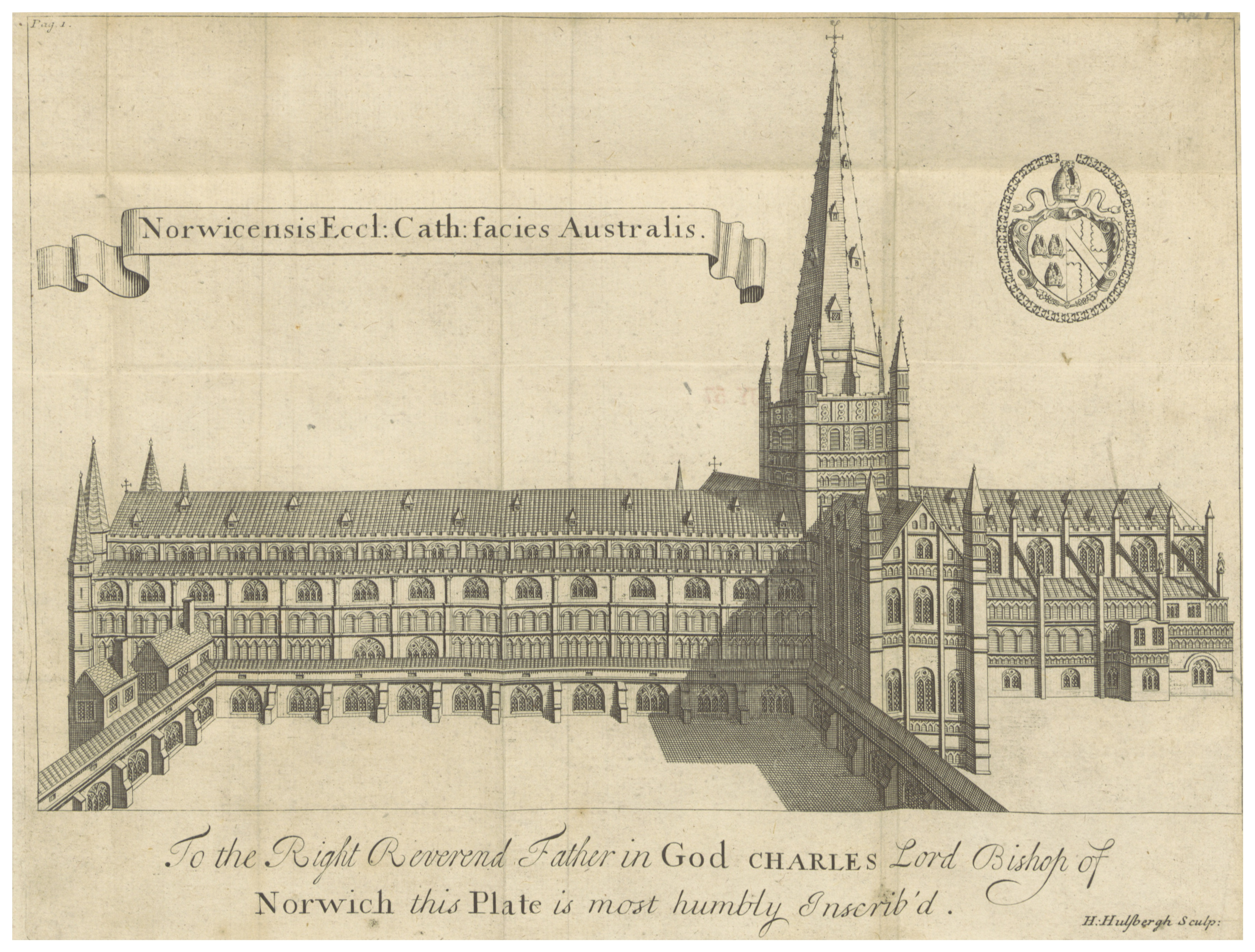
Ayleward served at organist at Norwich Cathedral (illustrated 1723)

During the English Restoration, Ayleward was appointed organist and choirmaster of Norwich Cathedral. He held office there from 1661 to 1664, and again from 1666 to 1669, working under the director of music Christopher Gibbons, the son of Orlando Gibbons.

During the Interregnum Ayleward no doubt did much writing of choral pieces, possibly for private home performance, as, to mark the coronation of Charles II, he produced twenty-five anthems, all showing highly original composition. During the year 1664–1665, Ayleward gave up his position at Norwich, and he appears to have been away at "the assizes". There is no indication of what caused this "call". However, he was reappointed in 1665 and remained at his position until his death on 15 October 1669.

His compositions are unusual in that they call for three or four solo voices in the same range, in some cases, and they required massive resources for full performance. They were extensively scored works for many, many performers, and greater personnel than Norwich may have possessed in its regular choir. All the manuscripts of his compositions were owned by Norwich Cathedral, and these were purchased by A. H. Mann and published.

Some of Ayleward's hymns and musical settings for evensong (especially his Responses) remain in use in the Church of England.
