= Organs of Granada Cathedral =

Granada Cathedral has two organs built in the middle of the 18th century by Leonardo Fernández Ávila. There was a tradition of twin organs in Spain. At Granada the instruments face each other and the organ cases have nearly twin facades.

The organs sound different from each other. This may always have been the case (a report from 1750 describes the Gospel organ as having the sweeter tone), but they now reflect the different ways the instruments have been maintained over the years. The Epistle organ was restored in 2026 with a view to recovering its original Baroque sound, whereas the Gospel organ has been modernised. The result is that the organs use different tuning systems which does not allow for dialogue between the two.

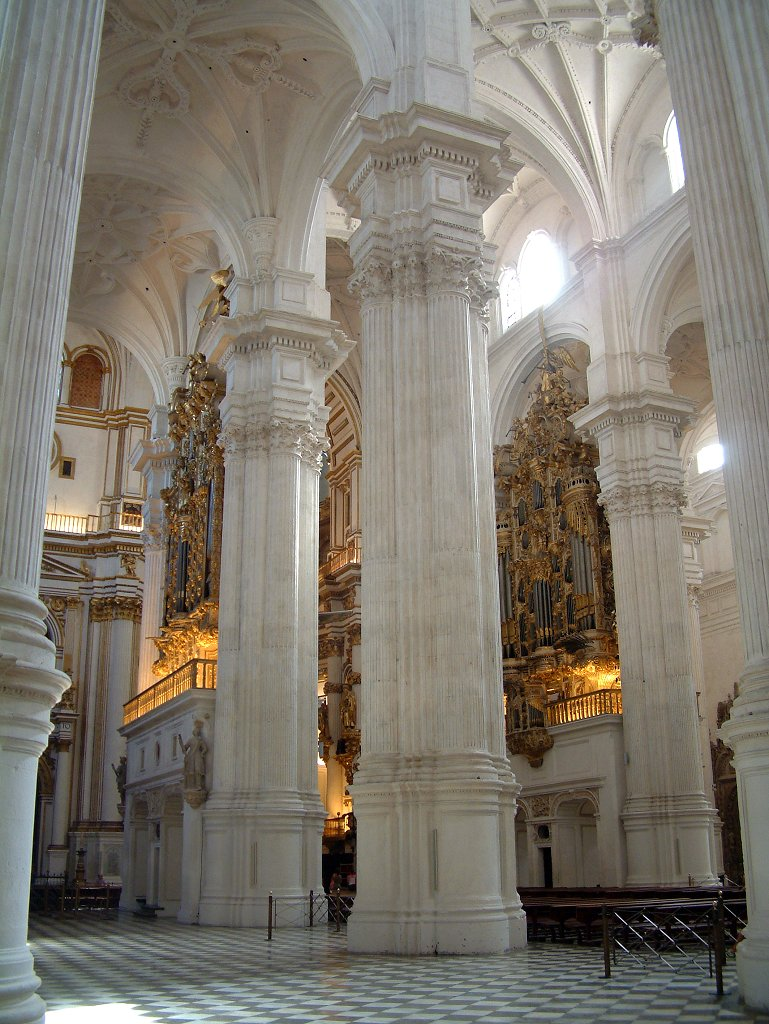
Both organs are visible here; the gospel organ is on the left

Since the restoration of the Epistle organ was finished in 2026, there has been a series of recitals on the instrument by celebrity organists, including Olivier Latry, the senior organist of Notre Dame. Although Latry does not specialize in the music of a specific time period, his programme for Granada featured music from before the year 1800 in keeping with the strengths of the instrument.
