= Organ of Alexander VI =

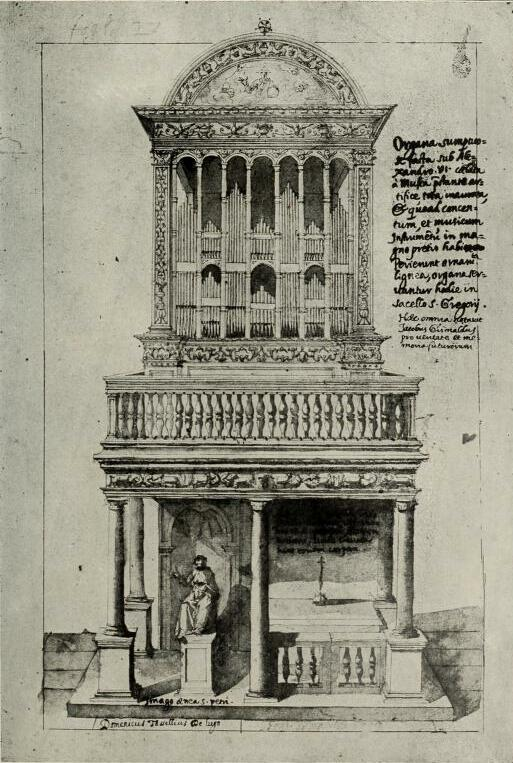
View of the organ from the Vatican Album (16th century)

The organ of Alexander VI was a massive pipe organ built in Old St. Peter's Basilica, in Rome, by order of Pope Alexander VI at the end of the 15th century.

== History ==
The organ was commissioned by Alexander VI in 1495 from the organist Domenico di Lorenzo. The funds for the construction of the instrument would be given by the pope and the cathedral chapter.

By 1501, Alexander VI had issues with the chapter due to failing to comply with his economic commitments.

The organ disappeared in the 16th century, during the construction of the nave of the currently standing St. Peter's basilica. It had been previously depicted in the plan of the old basilica, designed by Tiberio Alfarano.

== Description ==
The organ could be found on the Epistle side of the central nave of the old basilica, to the south of the crossing. It was made up of two levels, as the instrument was elevated on a floor supported by six Doric order columns, which were by themselves placed on pedestals.

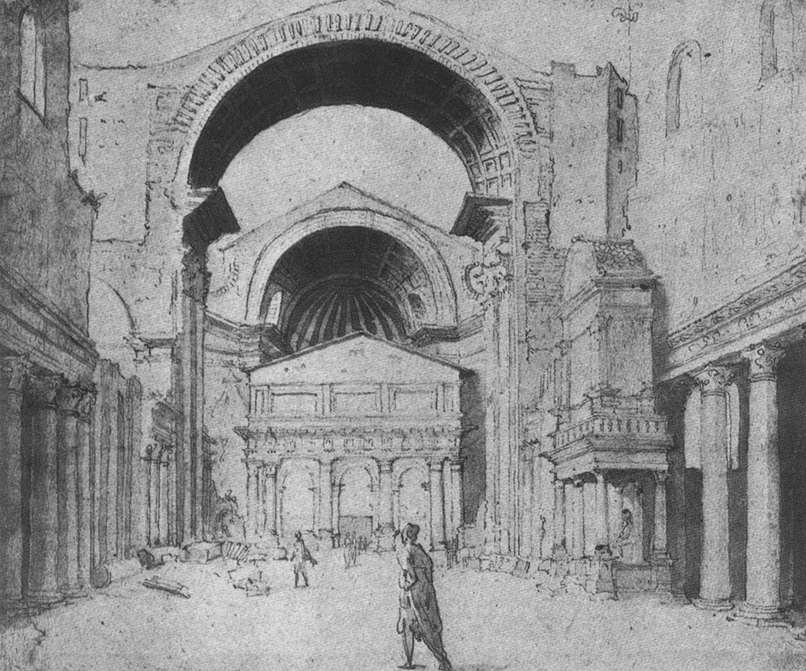
The organ in its original spot during the construction of the new basilica. (Drawing by Heemskerck, 1535)

The top floor contained the casing of the organ on a rectangular base, featuring a curved pediment decorated by paintings of Giovanni Aspertini. The casing also featured Alexander VI's coat of arms.

The lower floor was elevated above the rest of the floor of the basilica by stairs. Within the space between both floors, delimited by columns, various religious pieces of art could be found. Among several paintings, two pieces stand out:

- A bronze statue of St. Peter, preserved in the new basilica.
- The Madonna sub organo, a painting attributed to Giotto, which disappeared during the construction of the new basilica. A tombstone was placed in memory of the painting within the catacombs of the new basilica.
