= Contrary Winds (painting) =

1843 painting by Thomas Webster

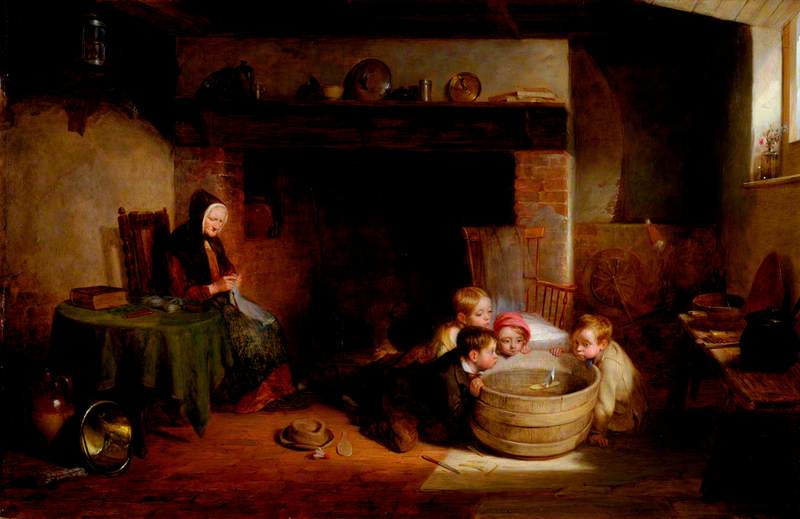
- Artist: Thomas Webster
- Year: 1843
- Type: Oil on panel, genre painting
- Dimensions: 37.3 cm × 57.1 cm (14.7 in × 22.5 in)
- Location: Victoria and Albert Museum, London

Contrary Winds is an 1843 genre painting by the British artist Thomas Webster. It depicts a scene of idyllic childhood in an English cottage where a children"s game of sailing boats in a washing tub is taking place. An older woman is seated on the left sewing. The painting was displayed at the 1844 exhibition of the British Institution held in Pall Mall. It was acquired by the John Sheepshanks who in 1857 donated it to the Victoria and Albert Museum as part of the Sheepshanks Gift.

== Bibliography ==
- Begiato, Joanne. Manliness in Britain, 1760–1900: Bodies, Emotion, and Material Culture. Manchester University Press, 2020.
- Roe, Sonia. Oil Paintings in Public Ownership in the Victoria and Albert Museum. Public Catalogue Foundation, 2008.
