= Preces =

Traditional prayer in Christianity

In Christian liturgical worship, Preces (Latin for 'prayers'; /ˈpriːsiːz/ PREE-seez), also known in Anglican prayer as the Suffrages or Responses, describe a series of short petitions said or sung as versicles and responses by the officiant and the gathered worshippers respectively. Versicle-and-response is one of the oldest forms of prayer in Christianity, with its roots in Hebrew prayers during the time of the Temple in Jerusalem. In many prayer books the versicles and responses comprising the preces are denoted by special glyphs:

- Versicle: ℣, a letter V crossed by an oblique line – Unicode 2123, HTML entity &#8483;
- Response: ℟, a letter R crossed by an oblique line – Unicode 211F, HTML entity &#8479;

== In Anglicanism ==
In Anglican liturgy (and Lutherans, in their Matins services) the Preces or Responses refer to the opening and closing versicles and responses of Morning Prayer and Evening Prayer in the Book of Common Prayer and other more modern service books. The two prayer services each begin with the following:

Versicle: O Lord, open thou our lips:
Response: And our mouth shall shew forth thy praise.
Versicle: O God, make speed to save us:
Response: O Lord, make haste to help us.
Versicle: Glory be to the Father, and to the Son, and to the Holy Ghost.
Response: As it was in the beginning, is now, and ever shall be, world without end. Amen.
Versicle: Praise ye the Lord.
Response: The Lord's name be praised.

The closing preces, also known as the Lesser Litany, occur later in the service, after the Apostles' Creed. Originally, the Creed was placed after the Lord's Prayer, following pre-Reformation use, and as in the Roman Rite (see below):

Versicle: The Lord be with you.
Response: And with thy spirit.
Versicle: Let us pray.
Lord, have mercy upon us.
Response: Christ, have mercy upon us.
Lord, have mercy upon us.
Our Father...
Versicle: O Lord, shew thy mercy upon us.
Response: And grant us thy salvation.
Versicle: O Lord, save the King.
Response: And mercifully hear us when we call upon thee.
Versicle: Endue thy Ministers with righteousness.
Response: And make thy chosen people joyful.
Versicle: O Lord, save thy people.
Response: And bless thine inheritance.
Versicle: Give peace in our time, O Lord.
Response: Because there is none other that fighteth for us, but only thou, O God.
Versicle: O God, make clean our hearts within us.
Response: And take not thy Holy Spirit from us.

These derive from the preces of the pre-Reformation liturgy, which generally quote verses of the psalms. In particular, the closing preces of the two daily offices of the Book of Common Prayer were adapted by Thomas Cranmer mainly from the ferial preces of Lauds, Prime and Vespers. The preces in the other occasional offices are similarly mostly derived from their pre-Reformation counterparts in the Sarum Use.

There are many musical settings of the text, usually referred to as the Responses, ranging from largely homophonic settings such as those by William Byrd and Thomas Morley, to more elaborate arrangements that may even require organ accompaniment. Other common choral settings of the Responses include those by Thomas Tomkins, William Smith, Richard Ayleward, Bernard Rose and Humphrey Clucas.

== In Catholicism ==
=== Roman Rite ===
In the Roman Rite, the term preces is not applied in a specific sense to the versicles and responses of the different liturgical hours, on which those used in the Anglican services are based. In the Roman Rite's Liturgy of the Hours, the word preces is used in the Latin text with the generic meaning of 'prayers', but it also has a specialized meaning in reference to the prayers said at Morning and Evening Prayer after the Benedictus or Magnificat and followed by the Lord's Prayer and the concluding prayer or collect. They vary with the seasons (Advent, Christmastide, Lent, Eastertide, and Ordinary Time), being repeated generally only at four-week intervals, and with the celebration of saints. In the most widely used English translation of the Liturgy of the Hours, they are referred to as Intercessions, and are very similar to the General Intercessions found within the confines of the Mass.

An example is that of Morning Prayer on Thursday of Week 2 in Ordinary Time:

Versicle: Blessed be our God and Father: he hears the prayers of his children.
Response: Lord, hear us.
Versicle: We thank you, Father for sending us your Son: – let us keep him before our eyes throughout this day.
Response: Lord, hear us.
Versicle: Make wisdom our guide, – help us walk in newness of life.
Response: Lord, hear us.
Versicle: Lord, give us your strength in our weakness: – when we meet problems give us courage to face them.
Response: Lord, hear us.
Versicle: Direct our thought, our words, our actions today, – so that we may know, and do, your will.
Response: Lord, hear us.

==== Pre-1962 Roman Rite ====
In iterations of the Roman Breviary before 1962, however, the preces proper referred to a series of versicles and responses which were said either standing or kneeling, depending on the day or liturgical season in which the prayers were to be uttered. There were two forms, the dominical or abridged preces, and the ferial or unabridged preces. These were said, as in the Anglican Communion, at both morning (Prime) and evening (Vespers) prayers. The dominical preces from the common Prime prayer, from an English translation of the pre-1962 Breviary, is:

Versicle: Lord, have mercy upon us.
Response: Christ, have mercy upon us. Lord have mercy upon us.
Our Father. [Said aloud, and the rest silently until:]
Versicle: And lead us not into temptation.
Response: But deliver us from evil.
I believe in God. [Said aloud, and the rest silently until:]
Versicle: The Resurrection of the body.
Response: And the Life everlasting. Amen.
Versicle: Unto thee have I cried, O Lord.
Response: And early shall my prayer come before thee.
Versicle: O let my mouth be filled with thy praise.
Response: That I may sing of thy glory and honour all the day long.
Versicle: O Lord, turn thy face from my sins.
Response: And put out all my misdeeds.
Versicle: Make me a clean heart, O God.
Response: And renew a right spirit within me.
Versicle: Cast me not away from thy presence.
Response: And take not thy Holy Spirit from me.
Versicle: O give me the comfort of thy help again.
Response: And stablish me with thy free Spirit.
Versicle: Our help is in the Name of the Lord.
Response: Who hath made heaven and earth.

After which would follow the General Confession of sins. This form of prayer has ceased to be used in the wider Roman Rite, except amongst Traditional Catholic groups.

=== Mozarabic Rite ===
In the Mozarabic Rite the preces or preca are chants of penitential character used only in Lent. They are in the form of a litany, with a short response (usually miserere nobis – 'have mercy on us') to each invocation.

=== In Opus Dei ===
In the Catholic prelature of Opus Dei, the Preces are a special set of prayers said by each member daily. The prayer was originally composed by Josemaría Escrivá by December 1930. It was the first common activity of the members of the group. Escrivá composed the prayer by putting together phrases that he took from established liturgical prayers, and from the psalms in accordance with what he preached in The Way, about "using the psalms and prayers from the missal" for prayer. The prayers have undergone several changes over time.

The Preces, also called the "universal prayer of the work" by members of the group, are described by one journalist as including a "blessing of everyone from the Pope to [the] Virgin Mary to the prelate of Opus Dei". John L. Allen describes its contents as follows: "invocations to the Holy Spirit, Jesus Christ, the Blessed Virgin Mary, Saint Joseph, the Guardian Angels, and Saint Josemaría, then prayers for the Holy Father, the bishop of the diocese, unity among all those working to spread the gospel, the prelate of Opus Dei and the other members of the Work, and invocations to Saints Michael, Gabriel, Raphael, Peter, Paul, and John (the patrons of Opus Dei)".
