= Humphrey Clucas =

British composer, singer and author

Humphrey Clucas (born 1941) is a British composer, singer and author.

Clucas read English at King's College, Cambridge, where he was a choral scholar. Having taught English in schools for twenty-seven years, while maintaining a separate singing career, he finally gave up teaching on his appointment as a Lay Vicar (member of the choir) of Westminster Abbey, from which he retired in 1999.

== Career ==
As a composer he is self-taught, and though well known for a set of Responses, written as an undergraduate, nearly all his serious work has been done since 1979. He has written a great deal of choral music, much of it liturgical. But there are also concert works for choir and orchestra and for unaccompanied choir (including a Stabat Mater with string quartet and an unaccompanied Requiem), a Housman song cycle for countertenor, a Clarinet Sonatina, a large body of organ music, including an Organ Symphony a series of works for double bass - and so on. He has written for a large number of English cathedrals, and also for the Vasari Singers, Gothic Voices, the organists Martin Baker, Robert Crowley and Peter Wright, and others. His latest work (Christmas, 2009), was a carol for the BBC Boy and Girl Chorister of the Year, the Choir of the Royal Hospital, Chelsea, and the Royal Harpist.

His two books of verse, 'Gods & Mortals' and 'Unfashionable Song', were published in 1981 and 1990. There is also a collection of Catullus translations (1985) and a small book of essays on A. E.Housman (1996). Items from the Catullus have been anthologised by both Penguin and O.U.P., and the whole collection was reprinted as an appendix to Aubrey Burl's biography of the poet (2004).

Clucas's memoirs, 'Taking Stock: The First Sixty Years', appeared in 2005. The longest chapter describes the rather unhappy musical establishment at Westminster Abbey in the 1990s. In 2009, he published 'Royal and Peculiar', three (fictional) crime stories set in Westminster Abbey (with poems by Anne Middleton).

He also wrote a men's-voice Magnificat in F-sharp major for King's College, Cambridge.
