= Daniel Farrant =

Daniel Farrant (1575–1651) was an English composer, viol player and instrument maker. He invented types of citterns, the poliphant and the stump, along with the early lyra viol. He is also credited with the invention of the early viola d'amore. The particulars of the stump are not known.

== Recordings ==
- Pavan, for lyra viol (John Merro lyra viol book) (4:31) on Short Tales For A Viol: English Music Of The 17th Century Vittorio Ghielmi
