= A Village Choir =

Painting by Thomas Webster

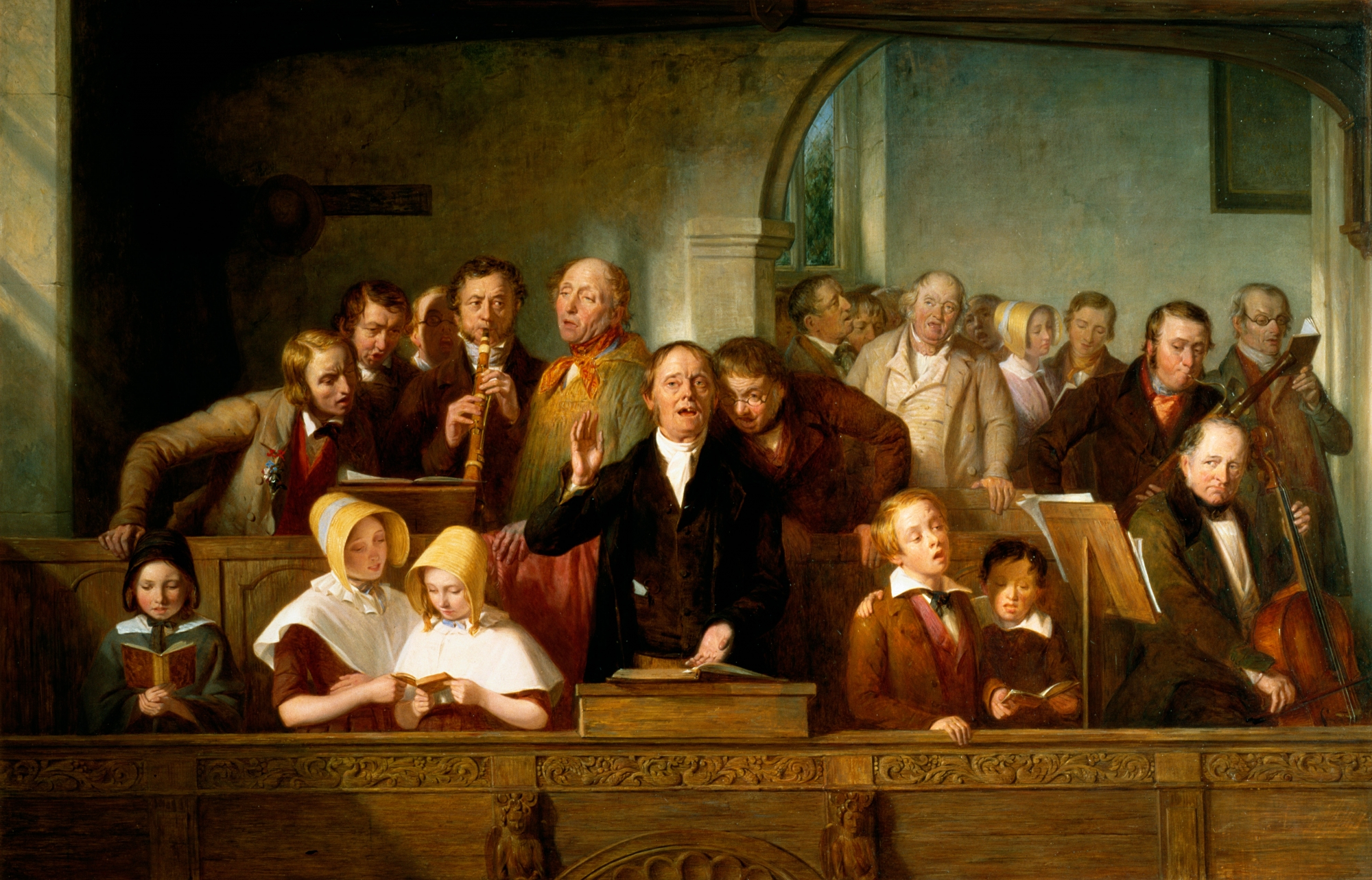
- Artist: Thomas Webster
- Year: 1847
- Type: Oil on panel, genre painting
- Dimensions: 60.4 cm × 91.5 cm (23.8 in × 36.0 in)
- Location: Victoria and Albert Museum, London

A Village Choir is an 1847 genre painting by the British artist Thomas Webster. Although produced in the Victorian era, it was inspired by the Regency era work The Sketch Book of Geoffrey Crayon by the American author Washington Irving. Based on the story Christmas Day from the collection, it depicts a traditional church choir in rural England. It became one of Webster's best-known works and was praised by a critic for "it's truth and diversity of character".

The previous year Webster has been elected as a member of the Royal Academy. He displayed the painting at the Academy's annual Summer Exhibition of 1847 at the National Gallery in London. It was acquired by the John Sheepshanks who in 1857 donated it to the Victoria and Albert Museum as part of the Sheepshanks Gift.

== See also ==
- The Village Choristers, an 1810 painting by Edward Bird

== Bibliography ==
- Fletcher, Pamela. The Victorian Painting of Modern Life. Taylor & Francis, 2024.
- Yeazall, Ruth Bernard. Art of the Everyday: Dutch Painting and the Realist Novel. Princeton University Press, 2008.
- Roe, Sonia. Oil Paintings in Public Ownership in the Victoria and Albert Museum. Public Catalogue Foundation, 2008.
- Wright, Christopher, Gordon, Catherine May & Smith, Mary Peskett. British and Irish Paintings in Public Collections: An Index of British and Irish Oil Paintings by Artists Born Before 1870 in Public and Institutional Collections in the United Kingdom and Ireland. Yale University Press, 2006.
