= William Smith (composer) =

English composer from Durham

William Smith (c. 27 March 1603 – April 1645) was an English composer from the city of Durham. He is chiefly known for his set of choral preces and responses for the Anglican liturgy of Evening Prayer.

== Life ==
William Smith was baptised on 3 April 1603. He was a Minor Canon when Richard Hutcheson was organist at Durham Cathedral.

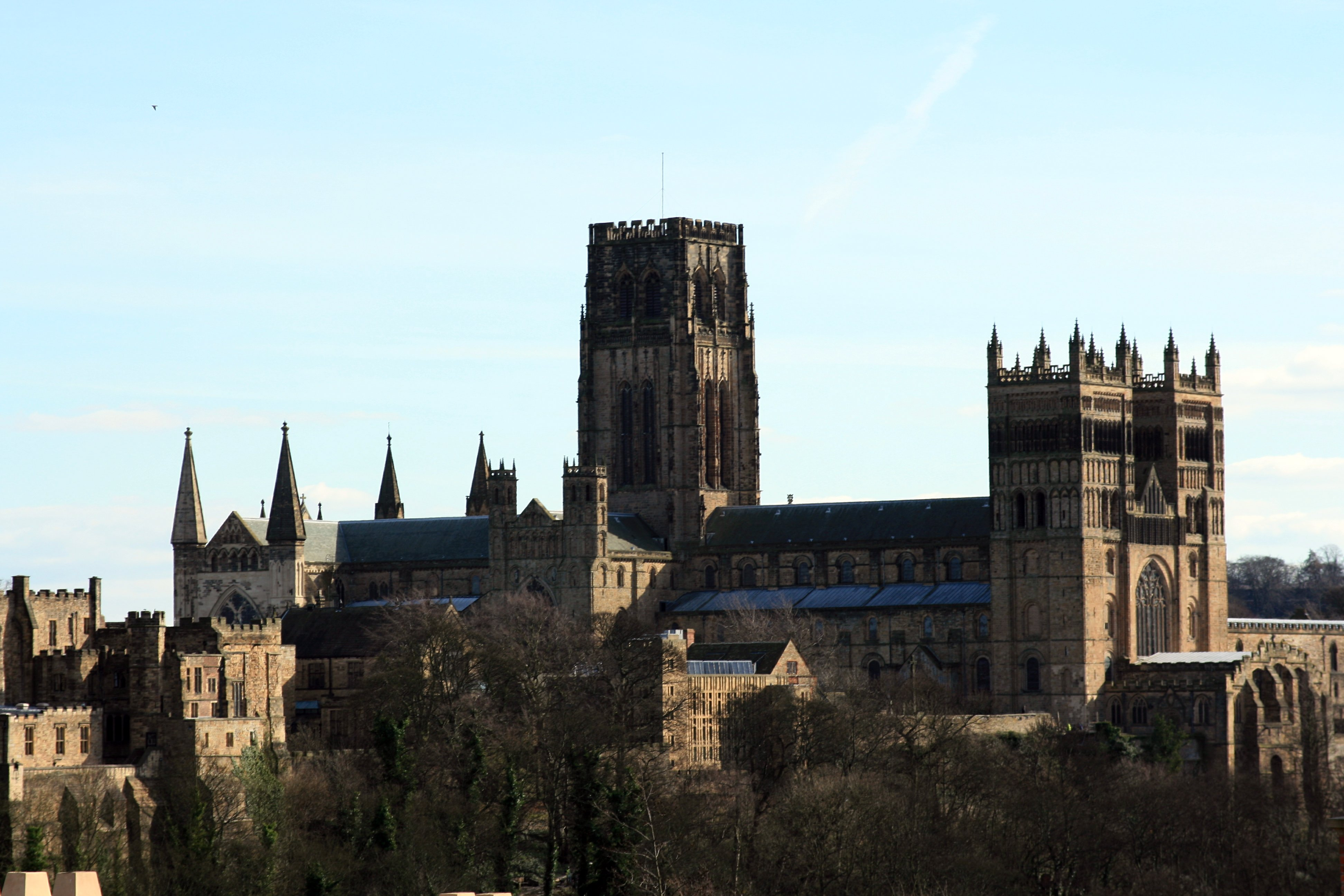
Durham Cathedral

== Works ==
In addition to the well known Preces and Responses, Smith composed seven verse anthems, five festal psalms, two communion services, and a Kyrie, ‘10: severall wayes’.

Additionally, there are two organ fantasias written in Smith's handwriting at the back of an organ book in the Durham Cathedral library. The first may be by Smith, although his name or initials do not appear in the score, but the second is of poorer quality and is unlikely to be by Smith himself.

Smith's anthems employ the prevalent device of imitative verse sections, and exhibit his predilection for lengthy verse sections and short choruses. For example, in 'Almighty and everlasting God', a concise and effective setting of the text of the Collect for the Purification, the first chorus lasts a total of just eight minim beats. Smith took this verse–chorus proportion to its extreme in his Second Creed, which is entirely a verse setting, apart from the final ‘amen’.
