= Thomas Webster (painter) =

19th-century English painter

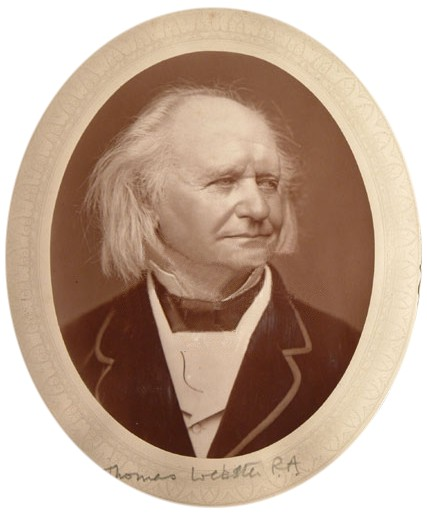

Thomas Webster RA (10 March 1800 – 23 September 1886), was a British painter of genre scenes of school and village life, many of which became popular through prints. He lived for many years at the artists' colony at Cranbrook in Kent.

== Life ==
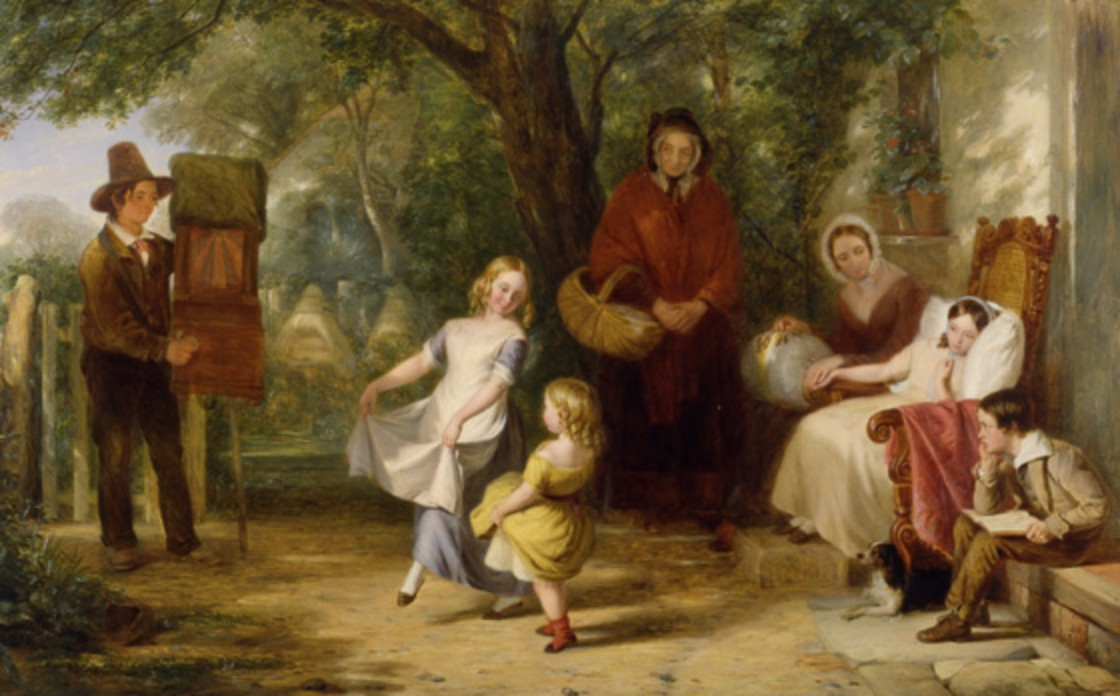
In Sickness and Health (1843; Victoria and Albert Museum, London)

Webster was born in Ranelagh Street, Pimlico, London. His father was a member of the household of George III, and the son, having shown an aptitude for music, became a chorister, first at St George's Chapel in Windsor Castle, and then the Chapel Royal at St. James's Palace in London. He abandoned music for painting, however, and in 1821 was admitted as a student at the Royal Academy, exhibiting, in 1824, a portrait of "Mr Robinson and Family". In the following year he won first prize in the school of painting.

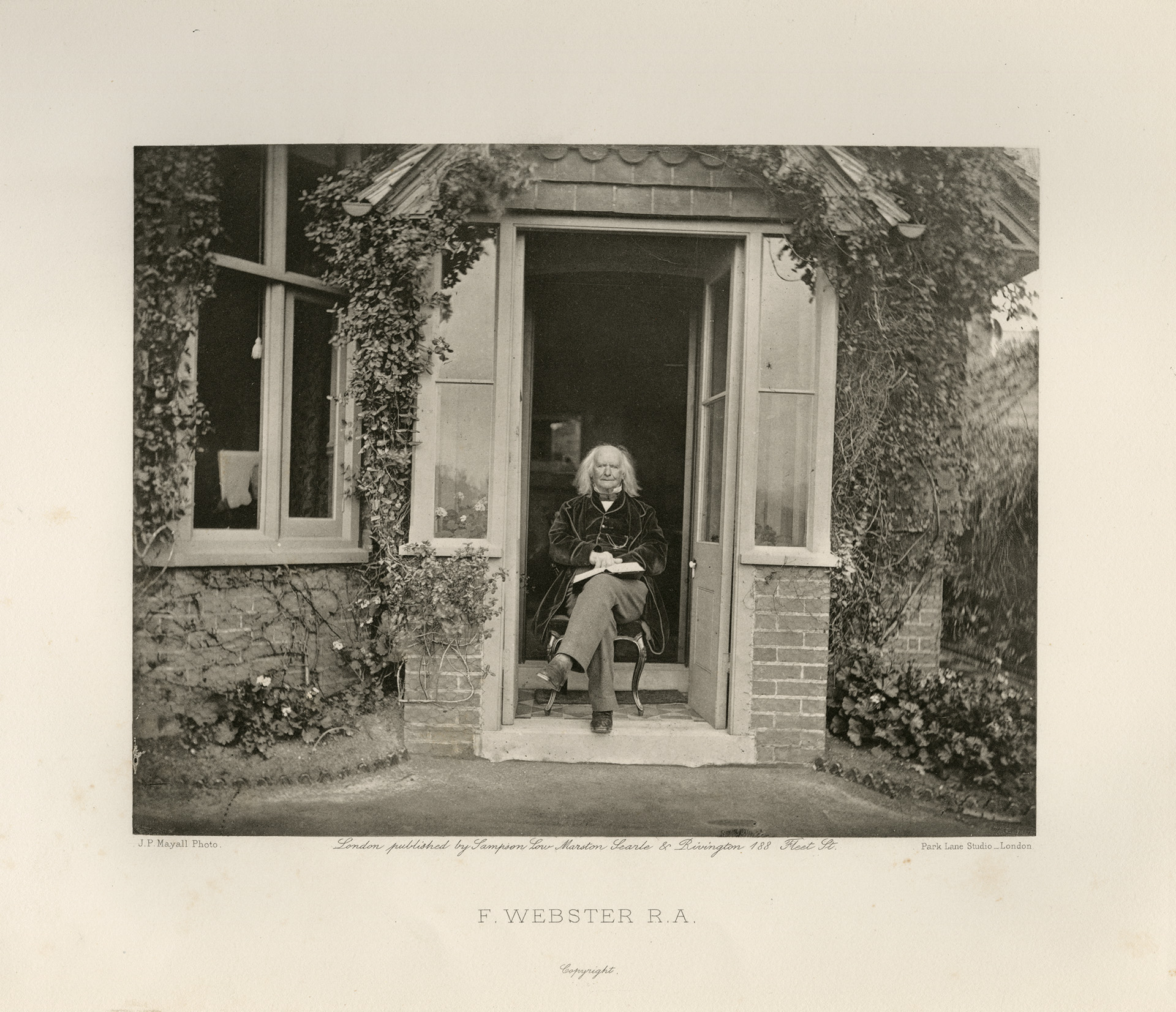
Thomas Webster by J. P. Mayall from Artists at Home, photogravure, published 1884, Department of Image Collections, National Gallery of Art Library, Washington, DC

In 1825, also, Webster exhibited Rebels shooting a Prisoner, at the Suffolk Street Gallery - the first of a series of pictures of schoolboy life for which he subsequently became known. In 1828 he exhibited The Gunpowder Plot' at the Royal Academy, and in 1829 The Prisoner and A Foraging Party Aroused at the British Institution. These were followed by numerous other pictures of school and village life at both galleries. In 1840 Webster was elected an associate of the Royal Academy (ARA), and in 1846 a Royal Academician (RA). He presented the painting Early Lesson as his diploma work. He continued to be a frequent exhibitor there until 1876, when he retired from the academy. He exhibited a self-portrait in 1878, and Released from School, his last picture, in 1879.

In 1856 Webster was photographed at the Photographic Institute in London by Robert Howlett, as part of a series of portraits of artists. The picture was among a group exhibited at the Art Treasures Exhibition in Manchester in 1857.

From 1835 to 1856 Webster lived at The Mall, Kensington, but the last thirty years of his life were spent at the artists' colony in Cranbrook, Kent, where he died on 23 Sept. 1886.

== Work ==
Webster became known for his genre paintings, often with children as subjects, depicting incidents from everyday life in a genial and humorous way. Many of these were exceedingly popular, particularly his Punch (1840) with which he procured associate membership of the Royal Academy.

In the limited range of subjects which he made his own, Webster was unrivalled. Some of his pictures - such as Please remember the Grotto, Snowballing and maybe The Swing - were issued as prints by Abraham Le Blond. The Smile (1841), The Frown and The Boy with Many Friends, are among the numerous pictures which became well known by engravings. He also contributed work to volumes issued by the London-based Etching Club: The Deserted Village (1841), Songs of Shakespeare (1843), and Etch'd Thoughts (1844).

Webster was influential on the work of fellow Cranbrook artists George Bernard O'Neill and Frederick Daniel Hardy.

== Gallery ==
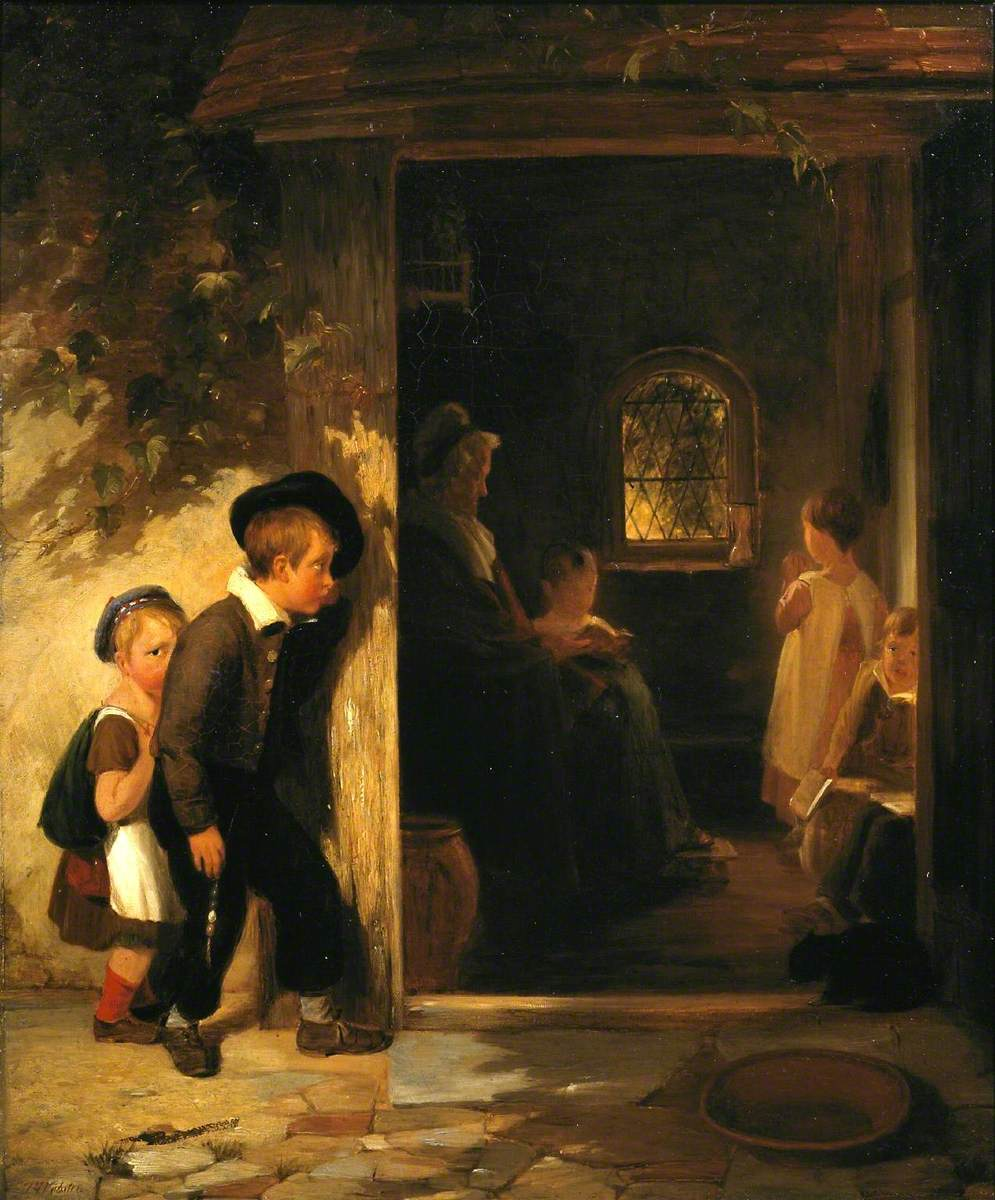
Late at School, 1834

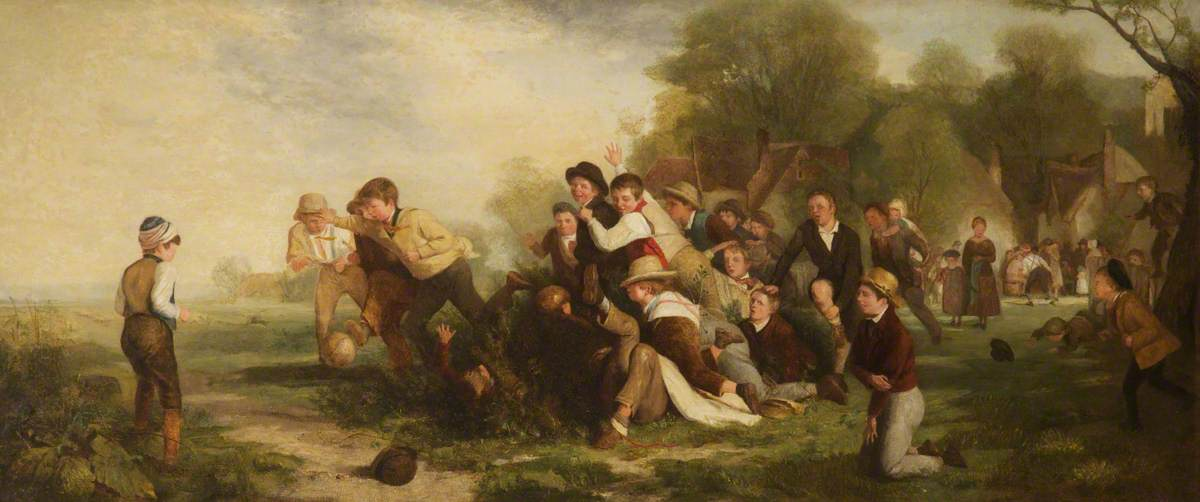
The Football Game, 1839

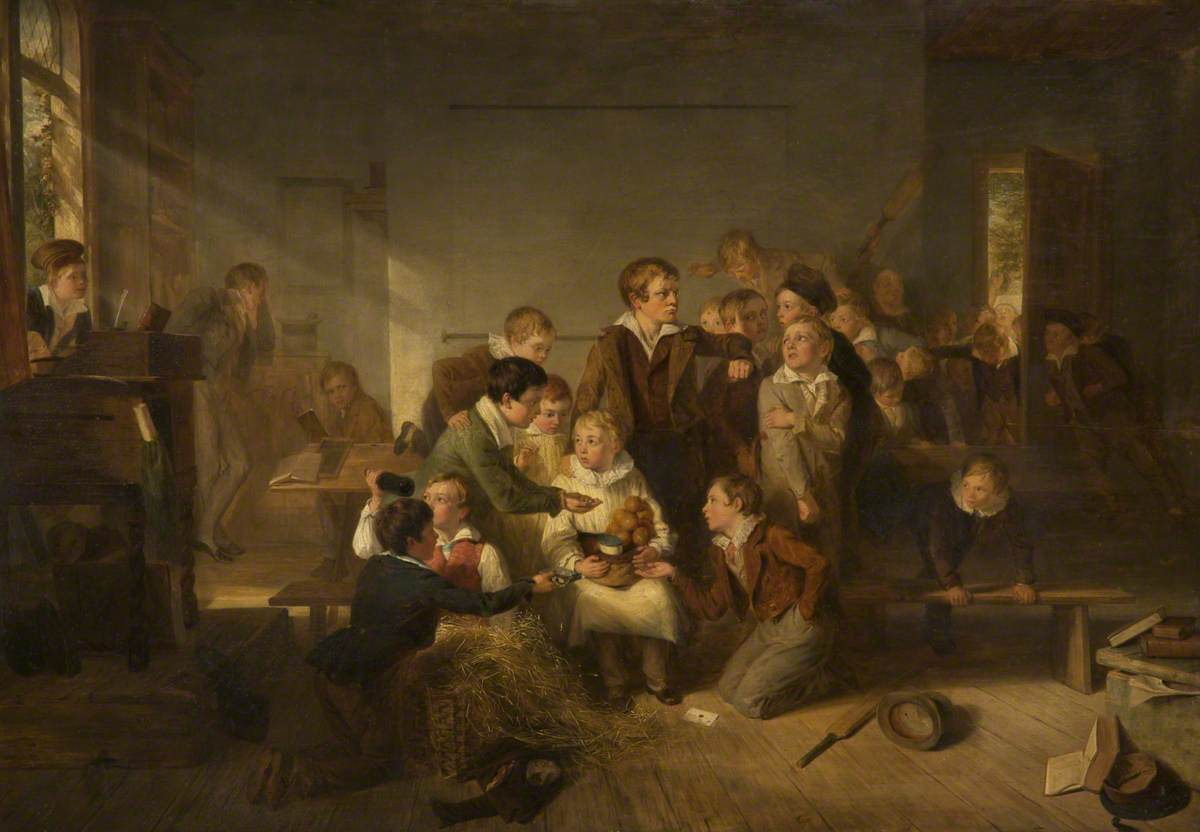
The Boy with Many Friends, 1841

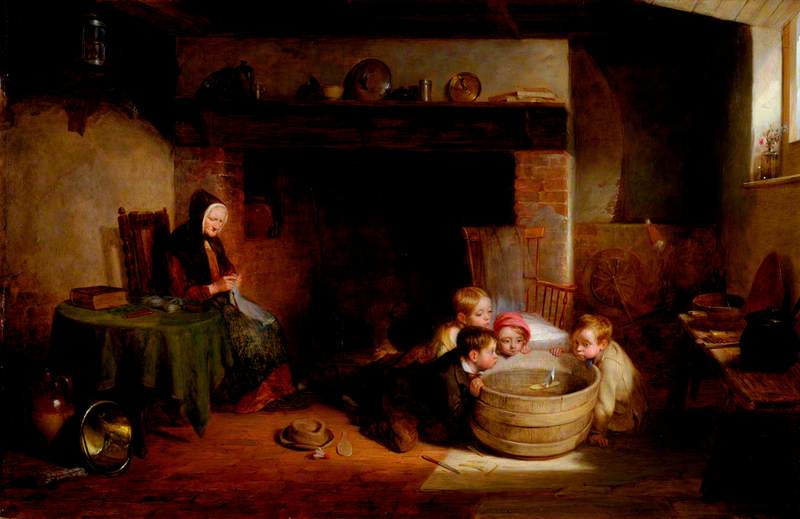
Contrary Winds, 1843

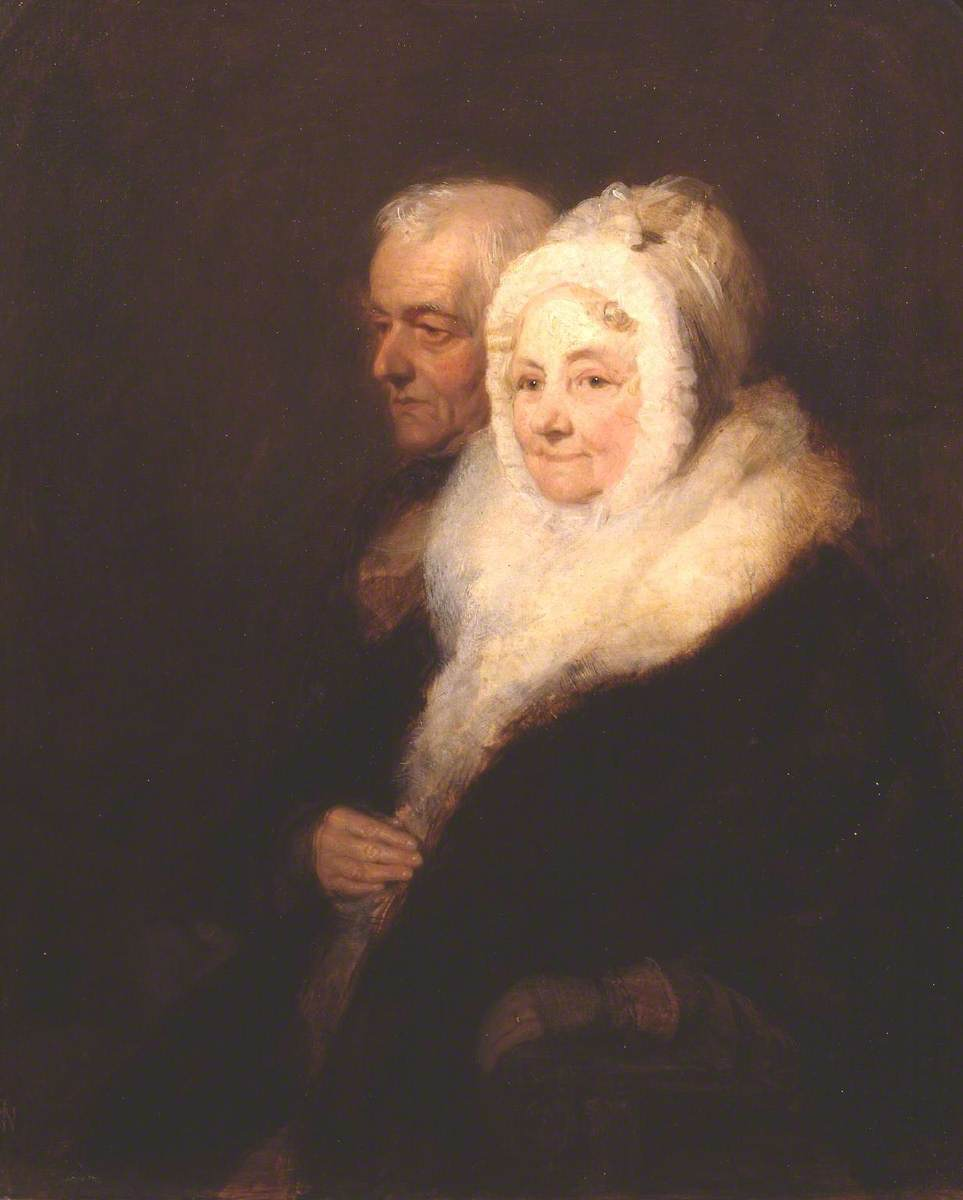
The Artist's Father and Mother, 1844

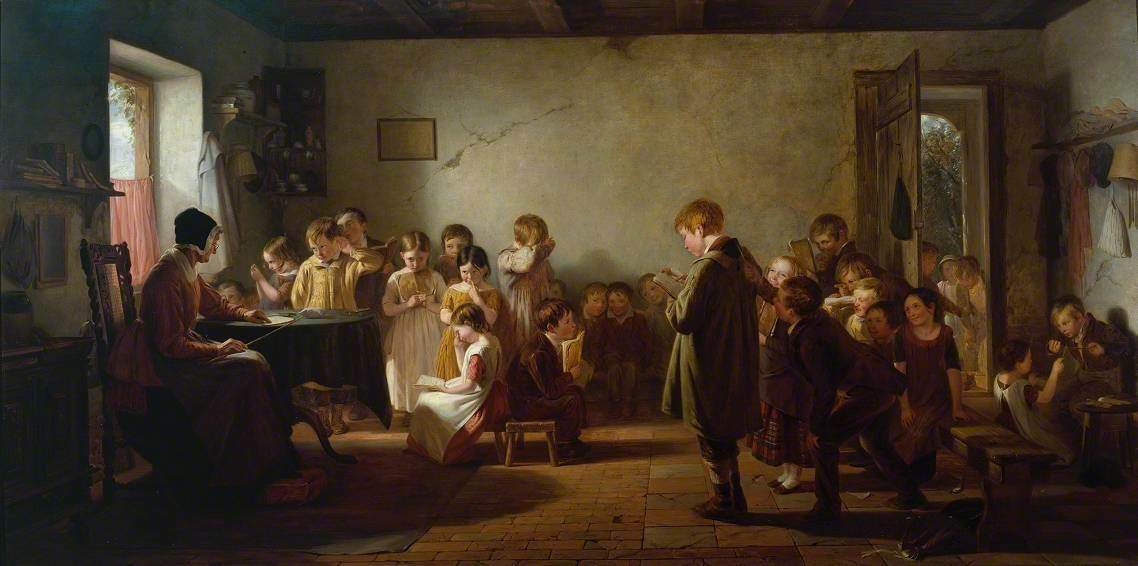
A Dame's School, 1845

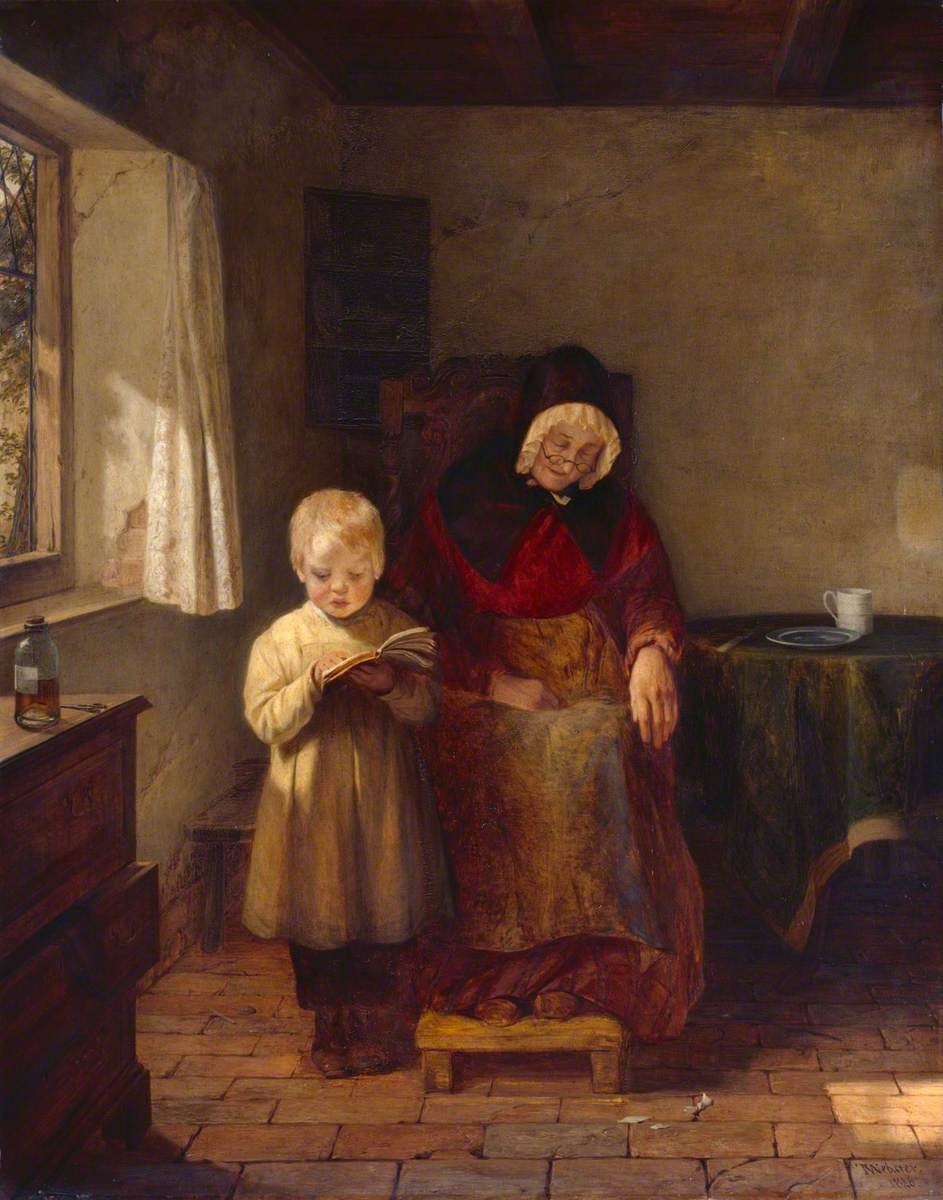
The Early Lesson, 1846

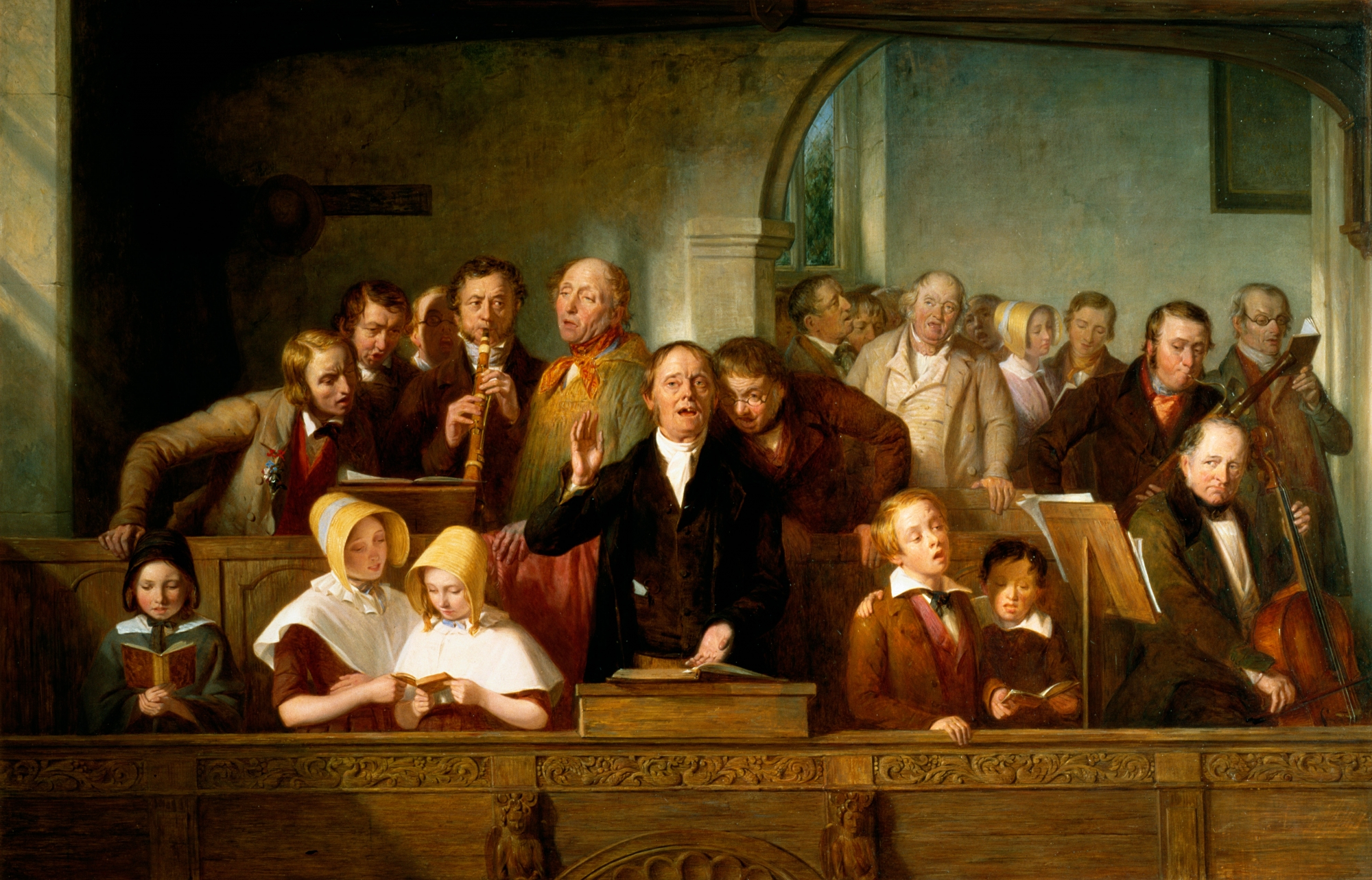
A Village Choir, 1847

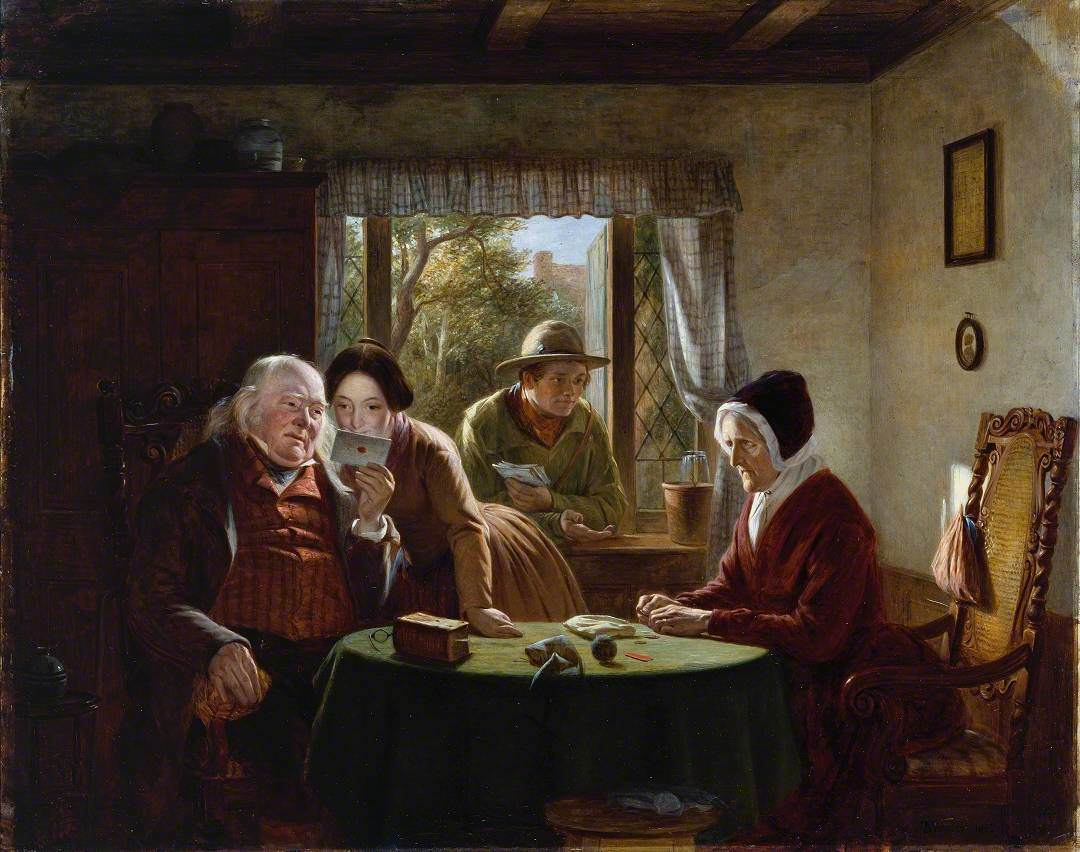
A Letter from the Colonies, 1852

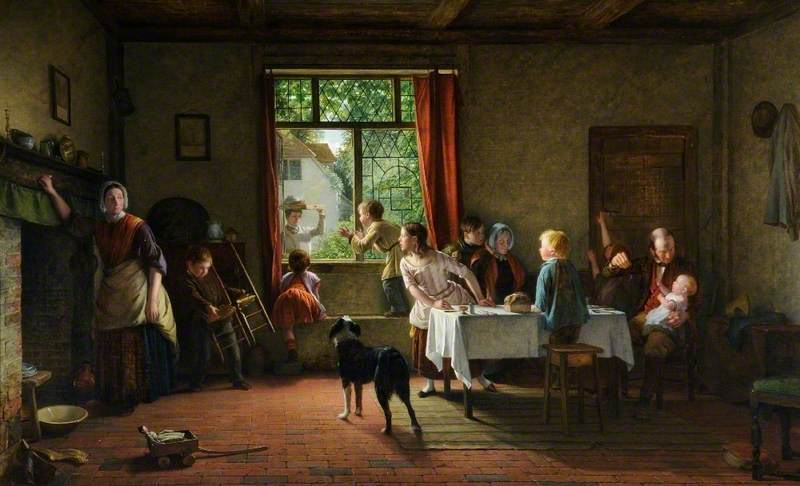
Roast Pig, 1862
