= Epistle side =

Side of a church on which the Epistle is read

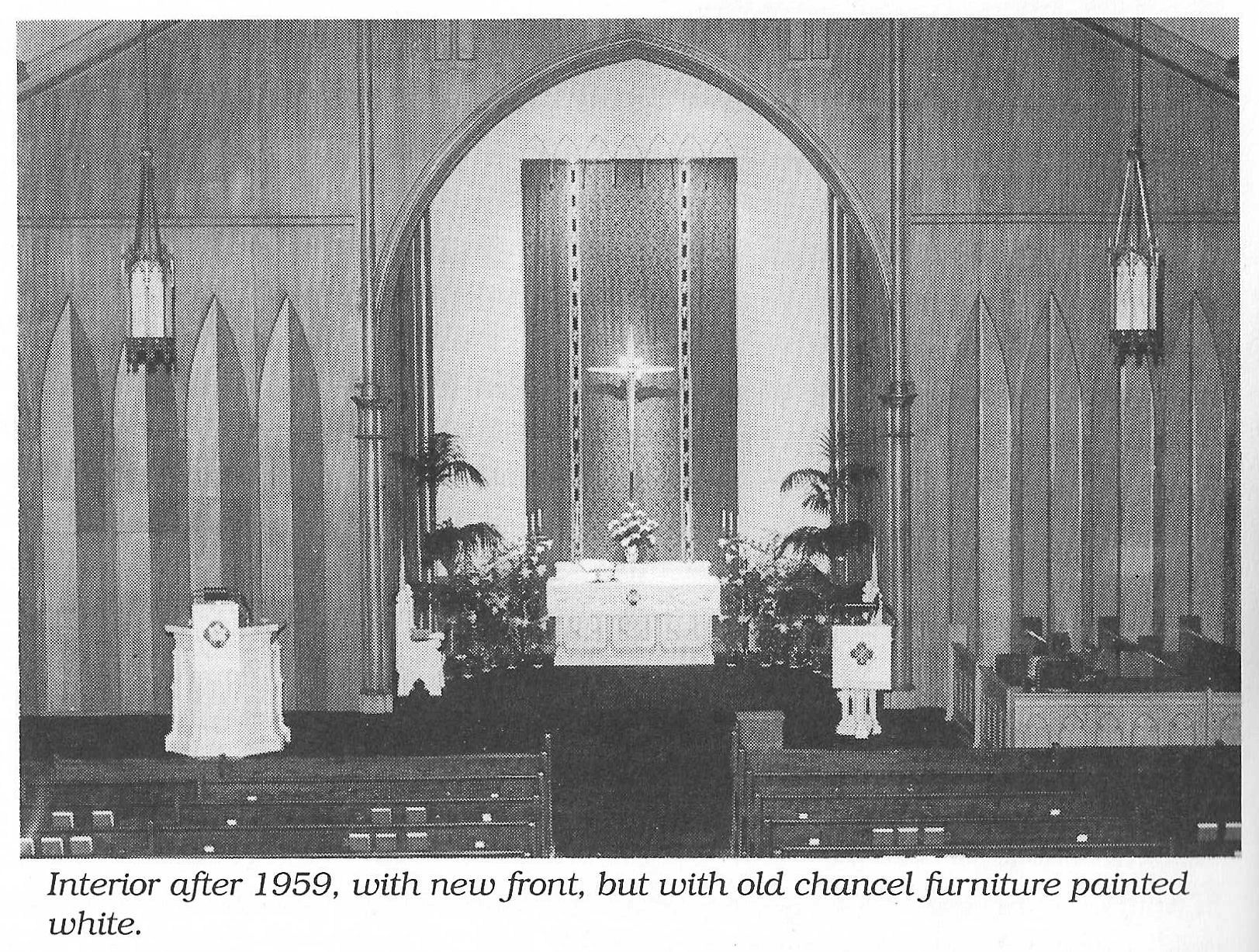
The chancel of Saint Stephen's Lutheran Church in Allentown; on the side left to the altar is the pulpit from which the Gospel is read by the pastor. On the side right of the altar is the lectern from which the Epistle is read, normatively by a reader.

In the liturgical traditions of Western Christianity, the Epistle side is the term used to designate the side of a church on which the Epistle is read during a church service. It is the right-hand side of the chancel as viewed by the congregation from the nave (i.e. the south side, when a church is orientated with the altar to the east, as is usual).

The Gospel side is the other side of the chancel, where the Gospel is read. Facing the altar from the nave, it is the left-hand (i.e. north) side. In some places, especially if a comment is based on a romance language source, the Gospel side will be cited as the Evangelist side.

In Lutheran and many Anglican churches, a pulpit is found on the Gospel side (the side left of the altar) from which the pastor reads the Gospel and preaches the sermon; a lectern is found on the Epistle side (the side right of the altar) from which readers read aloud the other Scripture lessons, such as the Epistle. The same occurs in Methodist parishes with a divided chancel though not in Methodist parishes designed with a pulpit-centered chancel that features a central pulpit that is situated behind the communion table (as with other Anglican and Presbyterian churches). Within the Catholic Church, in the Tridentine Mass, which is still in use among some communities, the lectern holding the Missal is moved from the Epistle side of the altar to the Gospel side after the reading of the Epistle.

== Gallery ==
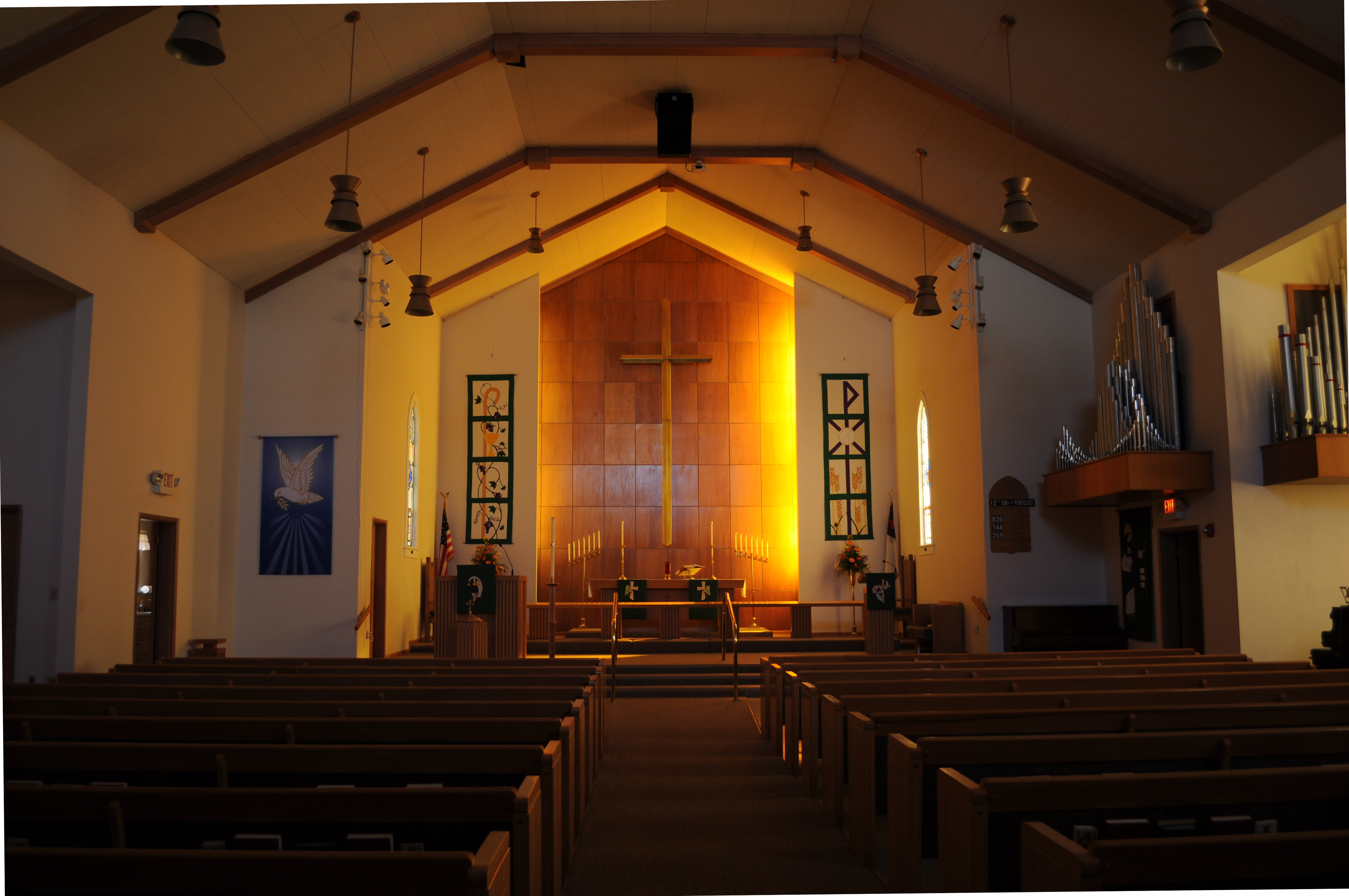
This Lutheran sanctuary delineates the standard practice of the pulpit being located in the Gospel side and the lectern being located in the Epistle side.

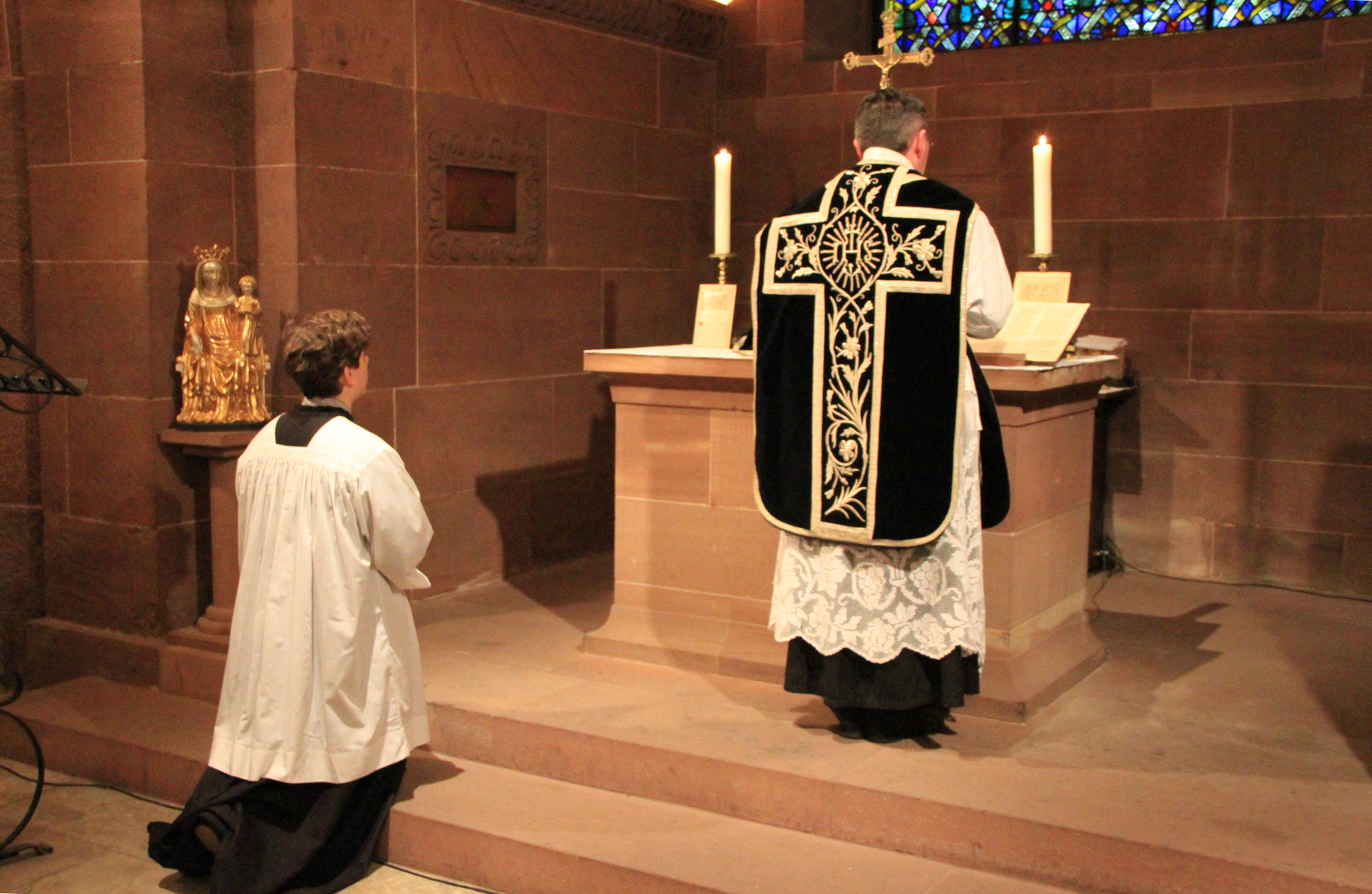
A Latin Catholic priest standing at the Epistle side during the offering of a Tridentine Mass

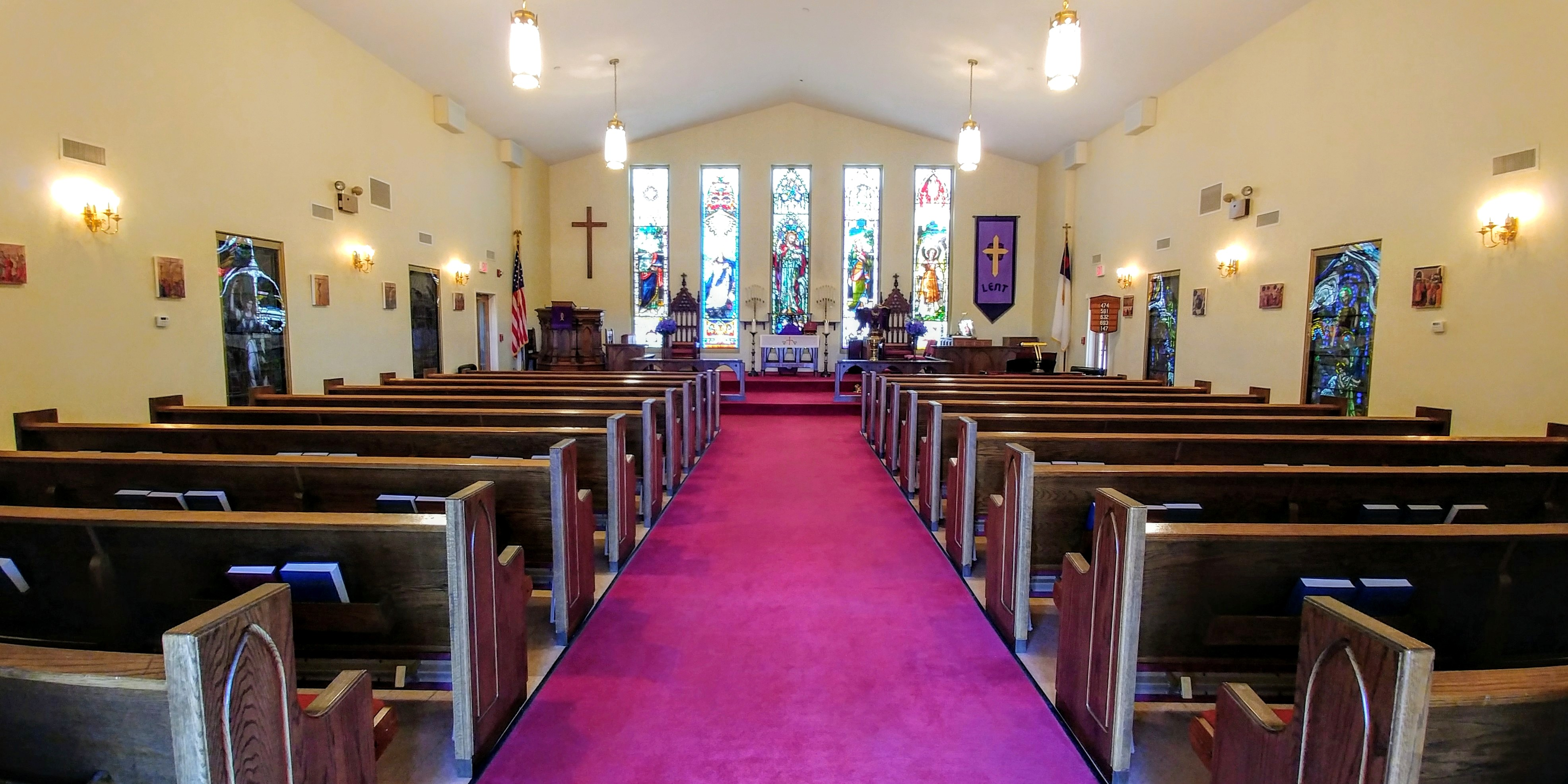
This Anglican chancel delineates the standard practice of the pulpit being located in the Gospel side and the lectern being located in the Epistle side.

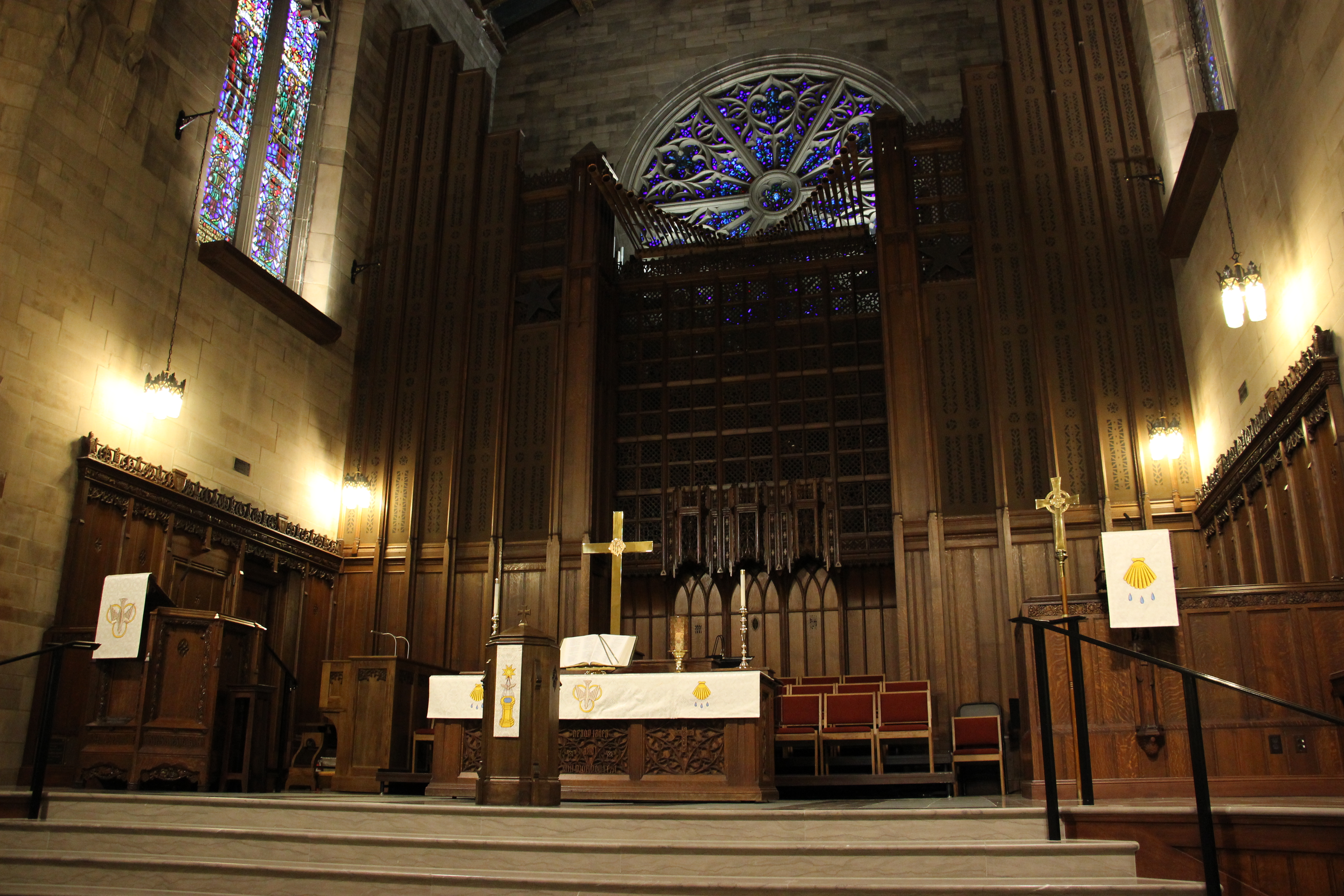
A Methodist church with a divided chancel containing the pulpit on the Gospel side and the lectern on the Epistle side.

== See also ==
- Decani
