= Decani and cantoris =

Sides of a church choir occupied by the Dean and the Cantor

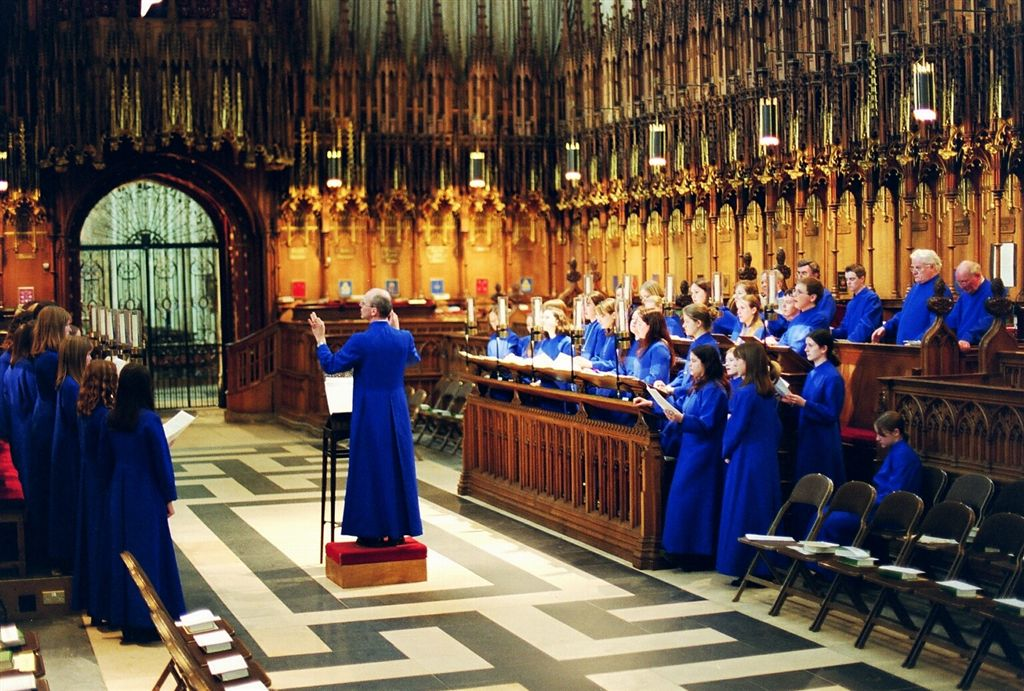
Evensong in York Minster, looking down the nave from beside the main altar; notice the choir arrangement into decani or Dean's side (as seen here, the left side) and cantoris or Cantor's side (here, the right side).

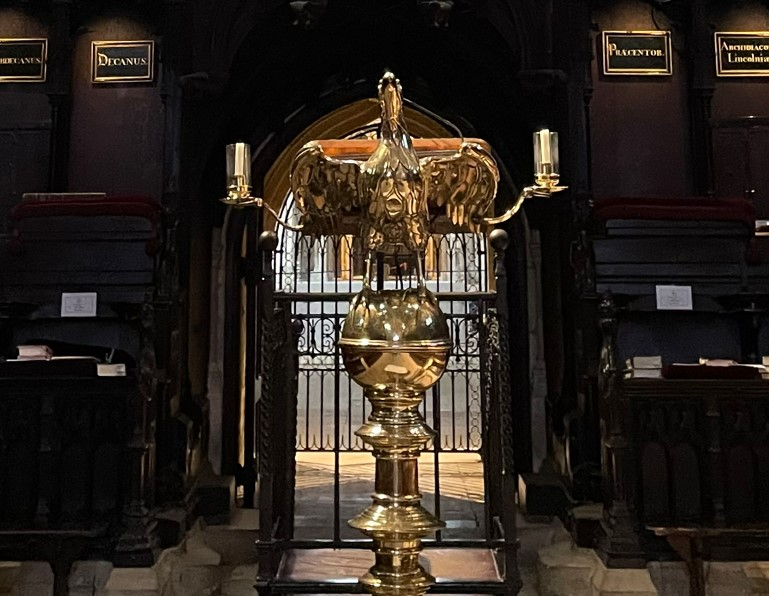
Stalls assigned to Decanus (left) and Praecentor (right) at Lincoln Cathedrals's St Hugh's Choir

Decani (/dɪˈkeɪnaɪ/; Latin: 'of the dean') and Cantoris (Latin: "of the cantor"; /kænˈtɔːrɪs/) are the sides of a church choir occupied by the Dean and the Cantor, respectively. The abbreviations "Dec." and "Can." are used. In English churches, the decani is typically in the choir stalls on the south side of the chancel, and the cantoris is on the left (liturgical North) side.

The association of the Dean with the south side has propagated from the Sarum (now Salisbury Cathedral) liturgical norm, a practice that then propagated through pre-Reformation England and Wales. There are some notable exceptions in the monastic cathedrals, where the senior cleric under the bishop was the prior; he often sat on the liturgical north. Hence, in Durham Cathedral, Ely Cathedral, St Davids Cathedral, Carlisle Cathedral, and Southwell Minster, decani is on the north.

While the cantoris side of the choir corresponds to the Gospel side of the altar (so called from the custom of reading the Epistle from the south end of the altar, and the Gospel from the north end of the altar), cantoris and decani properly refer only to sides of the choir, not to the sides of the altar. The arrangement of the cantoris and decani sections is called the "split chancel" model, which favors antiphonal and responsorial performance.

== See also ==
- Epistle side, another name for decani
