= List of Magnificat composers =

The Magnificat, in Latin also canticum Beat(issim)ae Virginis Mariae (the song of the (most) Blessed Virgin Mary), is a common part of Christian worship, for instance traditionally included in vespers, evensong or matins. As such it is often sung and was set to music by various composers.

== History ==
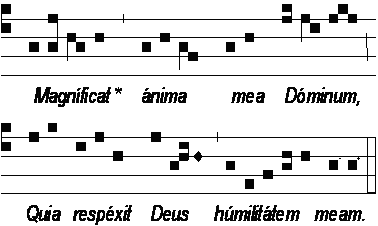
Magnificat in Gregorian chant

In Gregorian chant the Magnificat is sung according to the eight traditional psalm tones:

- Tonus I (first tone): Magnificat primi toni
- Tonus II (second tone): Magnificat secundi toni
- Tonus III (third tone): Magnificat tertii toni
- Tonus IV (fourth tone): Magnificat quarti toni
- Tonus V (fifth tone): Magnificat quinti toni
- Tonus VI (sixth tone): Magnificat sexti toni
- Tonus VII (seventh tone): Magnificat septimi toni
- Tonus VIII (eighth tone): Magnificat octavi toni

Composers, or collections of compositions, referring to or using all eight of the traditional Gregorian psalm tone settings of the Magnificat include the Choirbook, D-Ju MS 20 (various composers), the sixteen Magnificats by Palestrina, the Enchiridion utriusque musicae practicae by Georg Rhau, and Johann Pachelbel's Magnificat fugues.

Also the newer psalm tones were used for Magnificat settings:

- Tonus IX (ninth tone or tonus peregrinus): Magnificat noni toni or Magnificat peregrini toni – in Lutheranism this psalm tone became specifically tied to the Magnificat since Luther's translation of the Magnificat, "Meine Seele erhebt den Herren", is usually sung to a German variant of the tonus peregrinus. Later composers referring to the German Magnificat by using this variant of the ninth tone include Dietrich Buxtehude (Magnificat noni toni, BuxWV 205) and Johann Pachelbel with his Chorale preludes Magnificat peregrini toni
- Tonus X (tenth tone): Magnificat decimi toni – for later composers using this see e.g. Psalmi vespertini quatuor vocibus concinendi cum organo ad libitum, Op. 8 by Angelo Berardi (1675)
- Tonus XI (eleventh tone): Magnificat undecimi toni – for later composers using this see e.g. Magnificat compositions by Moritz von Hessen
- Tonus XII (twelfth tone): Magnificat duodecimi toni – for later composers using this see e.g. Magnificat compositions by Moritz von Hessen

Apart from the Magnificat sung to the psalm tones, in Gregorian chant there are also the Magnificat antiphons or O Antiphons inspiring composers like Arvo Pärt.

In seventeenth century polyphony no other religious text, apart from the Mass Ordinary, was set more often than the Magnificat. Often only six out of twelve verses of the Magnificat were set in polyphony, performance alternating verses sung in polyphony and verses sung in monody according to the church tone. In such alternatim settings the even verses were chosen more often for setting in polyphony, because they contained the last verse of the doxology, so that the singing of the Magnificat ended with a piece in polyphony.

Odd verses		Even verses	
1. (Luke 1:46)	Magnificat anima mea Dominum.	2. (Luke 1:47)	Et exultavit spiritus meus in Deo salutari meo.
3. (Luke 1:48)	Quia respexit humilitatem ancillae suae ecce enim ex hoc beatam me dicent omnes generationes.	4. (Luke 1:49)	Quia fecit mihi magna qui potens est et sanctum nomen ejus.
5. (Luke 1:50)	Et misericordia ejus a progenie in progenies timentibus eum.	6. (Luke 1:51)	Fecit potentiam in brachio suo dispersit superbos mente cordis sui.
7. (Luke 1:52)	Deposuit potentes de sede et exaltavit humiles.	8. (Luke 1:53)	Esurientes implevit bonis et divites dimisit inanes.
9. (Luke 1:54)	Suscepit Israel puerum suum recordatus misericordiae suae.	10. (Luke 1:55)	Sicut locutus est ad patres nostros Abraham et semini ejus in saecula.
11. (doxology)	Gloria Patri, et Filio et Spiritui Sancto.	12. (doxology)	Sicut erat in principio, et nunc, et semper et in saecula saeculorum. Amen.

Examples of such settings include the sixteen Magnificat settings by Cristóbal de Morales: half of these include only the odd verses ("anima mea" settings), the others only the even verses ("Et exultavit" settings) – both series of eight settings by Morales have one setting per traditional church tone.

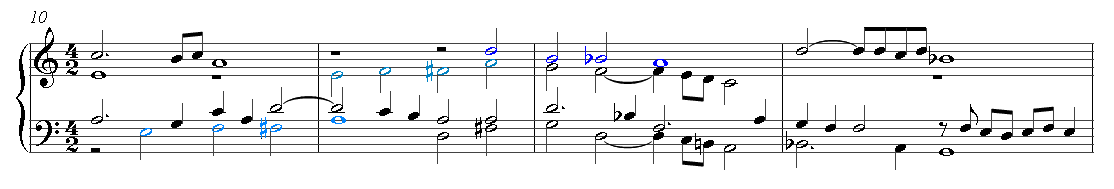
Bars 10–13 of Jean Titelouze's second setting of Deposuit potentes from Magnificat primi toni. The subject of this inversion fugue is highlighted with shades of blue.

From around 1600 such Magnificats are also composed for the organ, e.g. Jean Titelouze's 1626 Le Magnificat ou Cantique de la Vierge pour toucher sur l'orgue suivant les huit tons de l'Église (odd versets).

In the Baroque era the "cantata form" for religious compositions originated in Italy: like masses in the Neapolitan style, Magnificats could be set as a succession of self-contained sections in a variety of styles, choruses alternating with arias for solo singers. Francesco Durante's 1752 Magnificat in A minor is an example of a composition in this style.

In Anglicanism a Magnificat is usually combined with a Nunc dimittis in an (Evening) Service, in which case the English translation of the text ("My soul doth magnify the Lord") is used. For example, Orlando Gibbons composed such Services. In Orthodox Christianity the Magnificat, or "Song of the Theotokos", is sung in the Orthros (matins) as part of the Canon. All-night vigils include the Orthros, and a setting of such vigil thus usually includes the setting of a Magnificat, e.g. the "Canticle of the Theotokos" («Величитъ душа моя Господа», Velichit dusha moya Gospoda, "My soul doth magnify the Lord"), No. 13 in Tchaikovsky's All-Night Vigil.

== Table ==
Composer	Born	Died	Magnificat compositions
John Dunstaple	c. 1390	1453	Three Magnificats
Guillaume Dufay	c. 1397	1474	Three Magnificats, e.g. Magnificat Quinti Toni
Gilles Binchois	c. 1400	1460	Magnificats, e.g. Magnificat 3ii Toni
Hugh Kellyk	?	fl. c. 1480	Magnificat a 5 – see Eton Choirbook
John Nesbet	?	1488 (?)	Magnificat – see Eton Choirbook
William Horwood	c. 1430	1484	Magnificat secundi toni a 5 (SATTB) – see Eton Choirbook
Gaspar van Weerbeke	c. 1445	after 1516	Magnificat
Alexander Agricola	1445 or 1446	1506	Magnificat primi toni; Magnificat secundi toni; Magnificat octavi toni; (doubtful:) two Magnificat quarti toni
Josquin des Prez	c. 1450/1455	1521	Magnificat quarti toni; Magnificat tertii toni (both attributed on stylistic grounds), see e.g. Cancionero de Segovia
Edmund Turges	c. 1450?	1501 or later	One extant Magnificat in Caius Choirbook; Three Magnificats lost in Eton Choirbook
Walter Lambe	1450–1?	1504 or later	Magnificat in Eton Choirbook
Robert Wylkynson	1450 or later	1515 or later	Magnificats (one fragment, one lost) in Eton Choirbook
William, Monk of Stratford	?	fl. c. late 15th century	One four-part Magnificat in Eton Choirbook
Pierre de la Rue	c. 1452	1518	Eight Magnificats, see e.g. Choirbook, D-Ju MS 20
John Browne	1453 (?)	fl. c. 1490	One extant Magnificat; Three Magnificats lost – see Eton Choirbook
Jean Mouton	c. 1459	1522	Nine Magnificats, see e.g. Choirbook, D-Ju MS 20
Antoine Brumel	c. 1460	1512 or 1513	Magnificat primi toni; Magnificat secundi toni; Magnificat sexti toni; (doubtful:) Magnificat octavi toni – see e.g. Cancionero de Segovia;
Vasco Pires	?	c. 1509	Magnificat quarti toni a 2; Magnificat quarti toni a 4
Juan de Anchieta	1462	1523	Magnificat sexti toni; Magnificat tertii toni – See e.g. Cancionero de Segovia
Robert Fayrfax	1464	1521	Magnificat 'O bone Jesu' a 5 (STTTB); Magnificat 'Regale' (SATTB)
Jerzy Liban	1464	after 1546	Nine Magnificats in Tonus I–IX (1540)
Pedro de Escobar	c. 1465	c. 1535	3vv
Richard Davy	c. 1465	1507	Magnificats – see Eton Choirbook
William Cornysh	1465	1523	Magnificat in Caius Choirbook; Other Magnificat lost
Antoine de Févin	c. 1470	1511 or 1512	Three Magnificats, see e.g. Choirbook, D-Ju MS 20
Francisco de Peñalosa	c. 1470	1528	Magnificat primi toni, tertii toni, quarti toni (2), sexti toni, octavi toni (2) – see e.g. Lira sacro hispana
Antonius Divitis	c. 1470	c. 1530	Magnificats, see e.g. Choirbook, D-Ju MS 20
Jean Richafort	c. 1480	c. 1547	Magnificats, one included in Magnificat cum 4 vocibus, Book 1 (Venice, 1542)
Jacquet of Mantua	1483	1559	Magnificats, e.g. two in Magnificat cum 4 vocibus, Book 1 (Venice, 1542)
Loyset Piéton	?	fl. c. 1530	Magnificat included in Magnificat cum 4 vocibus, Book 1 (Venice, 1542)
Ludwig Senfl	c. 1490	1543	Magnificats (Tonus I-VIII)
John Taverner	c. 1490	1545	Magnificats for 4, 5 or 6 voices
Johannes Galliculus	c. 1490	c. 1550	Magnificat quarti toni (a 4); Magnificat quinti toni (a 4); Magnificat septimi toni (a 4)
Adrian Willaert	c. 1490	1562	Two Magnificats in I sacri e santi salmi che si cantano a Vespro e Compieta ... a quatro voci (1555)
Sixt Dietrich	c. 1494	1548	Magnificat octo tonorum for four voices (1535)
Nicolas Gombert	c. 1495	c. 1560	Eight Magnificats for five voices, Tonus I–VIII (1552)
Tugdual Menon	before 1502	1566–68	Magnificat included in Magnificat cum 4 vocibus, Book 1 (Venice, 1542)
Cristóbal de Morales	c. 1500	1553	18 Magnificat settings: five published in Venice in 1542; sixteen copied by Zelenka in the 18th century
Mattheus Le Maistre	c. 1505	1577	Magnificat octo tonorum (1557)
Thomas Tallis	c. 1505	1585	Magnificat (a 4) in Dorian Service
Vincenzo Ruffo	c. 1508	1587	Magnificats
Antonio de Cabezón	1510	1566	sets of six or seven Magnificat verses in eight tones
Christian Hollander	c. 1510–15	1568–69	Ten Magnificats (using eight tones, two versions in seventh and eight tone)
Cipriano de Rore	1515–16	1565	Magnificats, including Magnificat sexti toni
Hoste da Reggio	c. 1520	1569	Eight Magnificats for four voices in all traditional tones (Milan, 1550)
Giovanni Animuccia	c. 1520	1571	Magnificats
Bernardino de Ribera	c. 1520	c. 1571–72	Magnificats, see e.g. Lira sacro hispana
Philippe de Monte	1521	1603	Magnificats
Girolamo Cavazzoni	c. 1525	after 1577	In Intavolatura [...] libro primo (Venice, 1543): Magnificat primi toni, octavi toni; In Intabulatura d'organo [...] libro secondo (Venice c.1543–1549): Magnificat quarti toni, sexti toni
Giovanni Pierluigi da Palestrina	c. 1525	1594	35 Magnificats
Ludwig Daser	c. 1526	1589	2 Magnificats
Annibale Padovano	1527	1575	Magnificats
Francisco Guerrero	1527 or 1528	1599	Magnificats in all traditional tones, some with only even or only odd verses – a 4, a 5 or a 6 (Leuven 1563, Rome 1584, Nüremberg 1591, Venice 1597). E.g. Magnificat on the 4th tone (even verses); Magnificats included in Visperas de Reyes and in Lira sacro hispana
Orlande de Lassus	1530 or 1532	1594	Over 100 Magnificats, e.g. Magnificat Octavi Toni
Jacobus de Kerle	1531 or 1532	1591	Eight odd verse and eight even verse Magnificats in Magnificat octo tonum cum quatuor vocibus (Venice, 1561); Magnificat from Hymni totius anni ... et Magnificat (1558) lost
Hernando Franco	1532	1585	Eight odd verse and eight even verse Magnificats in eight tones in The Franco Codex (third tone ones lost)
Gallus Dressler	1533	c. 1585	Magnificat octo tonorum ... (Magdeburg, 1571)
Alard du Gaucquier	c. 1534	c. 1582	Magnificat octo tonorum (even verses, four to six voices, 1574)
Ippolito Chamaterò	late 1530s	after 1592	Magnificats
Paolo Isnardi	c. 1536	1596	Psalmi omnes ad vesperas ... vna cum tribus Magnificat, quorum vnum tum pari tum plena voce ... quatuor vocum (Venice, 1569); Magnificat omnitoni cum quatuor quinque et sex vocibus ... (Venice, 1582)
Hercules	?	fl. c. 1587 (?)	Magnificat omnitonum quatuor vocibus cum completorio, et quatuor antiphonis B. V. M. (Venice, 1587)
Francesco Rovigo	1540/1541	1597	Three Magnificat settings
William Byrd	c. 1540/43	1623	Magnificat from Great Service, Second Service, Short Service; Third Service; "Tones and Fauxbourdons"
Simone Gatto	c. 1545	1595	(Parody) Magnificats
Pedro de Cristo	c. 1545	1618	Magnificat secundi, quarti, quinti, sexti, septimi & octavi toni a 4
Balduin Hoyoul	1547–48	1594	Eight four-voice parody Magnificats (Tonus I–VIII)
Tomás Luis de Victoria	c. 1548	1611	Magnificats: even verses, Tonus I, II, III, IV, V, VI, VII, VIII – odd verses, Tonus I, II, III, IV, V, VI, VII, VIII – all (1600): Tonus I for 8 voices, Tonus VI for 12 voices
Jacobus Flori	c. 1550	fl. 1571–1588	Cantiones sacrae quinque vocum quas vulgo Motectas vocant quibus adjunctae sunt octo Magnificat secundum octo tonos […] tum omnivario instrumentorum concentui [...] (1599)
Theodorus; Leonardus	?	fl. before 1600 (?)	A set of four-voice Magnificats through the eight tones (?) (1594)
Sebastián de Vivanco	c. 1551	1622	Eighteen Magnificats, see e.g. Lira sacro hispana
Giovanni Giacomo; Gastoldi	c. 1554	1609	Several Magnificats, e.g. Magnificat an Otto Voci (SATB/SATB, 1601)
Girolamo Diruta	c. 1554	after 1610	Eight organ Magnificats in eight tones (most of them with transpositions), e.g. Magnificat 5to tuono in A Minor
Alonso Lobo	1555	1617	Antiphona ad Magnificat: O quam suavis est, Domine
Giovanni Croce	1557	1609	Magnificat omnium tonorum for six voices (1605)
Giovanni Gabrieli	1557	1612	Magnificats for 8 and 12 voices in Sacrae symphoniae (1597)
Paul Homberger	1559/1560	1634	Magnificat 2 vocum (cycle)
Giulio Belli	c. 1560	c. 1621	Psalmi ad vesperas ... duoque cantica beatae virginis ... (1592); Psalmi ad vesperas ... duoque cantica beatae virginis (1596); Psalmi ad vesperas in totius anni festivitatibus, ac tria cantica Beatae Virginis Mariae (1603)
Hieronymus; Praetorius	1560	1629	Full Magnificat cycle for organ (Tonus I–VIII + 'Germanice', 1611); Magnificats a 8 in all traditional Gregorian tones, among which a Magnificat 5. Toni cum canticis Ecclesiasticis (i.e. with Christmas interpolations, 1622)
Sebastian; Aguilera de Heredia	1561	1627	Canticum Beatissimae Virginis Deiparae Mariae (1618): four-, five-, six- and eight-voice settings, each in eight tones, some with even, some with odd verses
Jean Titelouze	1562/3	1633	Le Magnificat ou Cantique de la Vierge pour toucher sur l'orgue suivant les huit tons de l'Église (1626)
Duarte Lobo	c. 1565	1646	Magnificat primi, secundi, tertii, quarti, quinti, sexti, septimi & octavi toni
Manuel Cardoso	1566	1650	"Cantica Beatae Mariae Virginis" (1613)
Christoph Demantius	1567	1643	Trias precum vespertinum, qua continetur canticum B. Mariae Virginis, (etc.) (Nuremberg, 1602)
Claudio Monteverdi	1567	1643	Two Magnificats included in Vespro della Beata Vergine (1610) and two in Selva morale e spirituale (1640–41)
Adriano Banchieri	1568	1634	Magnificats
Paul Sartorius	1569	1609	Eight Magnificats a 6 in Chorbuch W.b. XIV (Salzburg, 1601)
Jakob Hassler	1569	1622	Magnificat 8 tonorum for four voices, even verses (1601)
Melchior Vulpius	c. 1570	1615	Canticum Beatissimae Virginis Mariae (Jena, 1605)
Giovanni Paolo Cima	c. 1570	1622	In Concerti Ecclesiastici (SATB and continuo, 1610): No. 42 Magnificat Quinti Toni, No. 43 Magnificat Sesti Toni
Michael Praetorius	1571 (?)	1621	Several Magnificats, e.g. Magnificat "Ut re mi fa sol la", Magnificat "In te, Domine, speravi" and Magnificat "Chorale melos germanicum" included in Megalynodia Sionia (1611); Magnificat Primi Toni (organ)
Filipe de Magalhães	c. 1571	1652	"Cantica Beatissimae Virginis" (1636)
Estêvão Lopes Morago	c. 1575	1630	Magnificat primi, tertii, quarti & octavi toni
Johann Stadlmayr	c. 1575	1648	Among others, ten Magnificats (seven of them parodies) in Sacrum Beatissimae Virginis Canticum (1603)
Erhard Bodenschatz	1576	1636	Das schöne und geistreiche Magnificat der hochgelobten Jungfrauen Mariae (...) auf die zwölf modos musicales in ihrer natürlichen Ordnung unterschiedlich mit vier Stimmen gesetzt. (Leipzig, 1599)
Stefano Bernardi	c. 1577	1637	Several Magnificat settings, including Magnificat for 4 voices, Magnificat for 5 voices, Magnificat for 6 voices
Melchior Franck	c. 1579	1639	Laudes Dei vespertinae (Coburg, 1622)
Orlando Gibbons	1583	1625	Magnificat ("My soul doth magnify the Lord") in Short Service (SATB), in Second Service (voices and organ)
Girolamo; Frescobaldi	1583	1643	Magnificat primi toni, Magnificat secundi toni and Magnificat sesti toni in Secondo libro di toccate (organ, 1627)
Heinrich Schütz	1585	1672	One Latin Magnificat (1665 or earlier), five German Magnificats (three extant: in Symphoniae sacrae II, 1643; in Zwölf geistliche Gesänge, 1657; in Swan Song, 1671)
Johann Hermann; Schein	1586	1630	Magnificat, odd verses, ST and continuo, No. 26 in Opella nova (1618); "Meine Seele erhebt den Herren", four-part harmonization of Luther's German Magnificat in Cantional oder Gesangbuch Augspurgischer Confession (1627, 1645)
Jacob Praetorius	1586	1651	Magnificat cycle, Magnificat Primi Toni (organ)
Antoine Boësset	1587	1643	Magnificat
Samuel Scheidt	1587	1654	18 Magnificats, e.g. in Tabulatura Nova (organ, 1624): Canon a 3 "Et exultavit" SSWV 122–123 and Magnificat 1–9 toni SSWV 140–148; in Geistliche Konzerte: three Magnificats with German interpolations, e.g. SSWV 299 for Christmas (SSATTB, 1635), and a German Magnificat, SSWV 331 (SATB and basso continuo, 1640)
Heinrich Pfendner	c. 1588	1631	Magnificat
Jacob Schedlich	1591	1669	Magnificat et intonationes precum verspertinarum (1613)
Melchior Schildt	1592 or 1593	1667	Magnificat I. toni (organ)
Heinrich; Scheidemann	c. 1595	1663	Magnificats for organ: Tonus I (WV 14), II (WV 15), III (WV 16), IV (WV 17), V (WV 18), VI (WV 19), VII (WV 65), VIII (WV 20, 66)
Giovanni Rovetta	1596	1668	Magnificats in Salmi concertati, Op. 1 (1626) and in Vespro solenne (1639)
Giovanni Giacomo; Arrigoni	1597	1675	Magnificat in Salmi [...] con vn Magnificat A Cinque voci concertate & due violini, Op. 9 (1663)
Johann Crüger	1598	1662	Meine seele erhebet den Herren
Giovanni Battista; Fasolo	c. 1598	1664	Organ Magnificats in eight tones in Annuale, Op. 8
Thomas Selle	1599	1663	Meine seele erhebet den Herren
Francesco Cavalli	1602	1676	Magnificats, e.g. Magnificat à 8 in Musiche Sacre 1656; Magnificats in 1675 vespers
Francesco Foggia	1604	1688	Magnificats, e.g. in Psalmodia Vespertina; Magnificat for 5 voices and continuo; Magnificat concertata con instromenti di 6 tono for SSATB/SATB choir (1665)
Henry Dumont	1610	1684	Magnificat for chorus and instruments Magnificat anima mea for double chorus and orchestra
Hieronymus (III); Praetorius	1614	1629	Magnificat I. toni (organ, formerly attributed to Hieronymus (I) Praetorius)
Johann Erasmus; Kindermann	1616	1655	Intonatio Magnificat 4. Toni and Magnificat Octavi Toni in Harmonia Organica (1645) 6th verse (Gloria) of Magnificat Octavi Toni
Matthias Weckmann	1616 (?)	1674	Magnificat II. toni (organ)
Isabella Leonarda	1620	1704	Magnificat op. 19 no. 10]
Johann Caspar Kerll	1627	1693	Modulatio organica super Magnificat octo ecclesiasticis tonis respondens (Munich, 1686)
João de Figueiredo; Borges	?	1674	Magnificat sexti toni a 8; Magnificat septimi toni a 8
Nicolas Lebègue	1631	1702	Livre d'orgue No.2 (1678), containing "...versets de Magnificat dans les 8 tons ecclésiastiques"
Dietrich Buxtehude	c. 1637/39	1707	Chorale preludes (organ): two Magnificat primi toni (BuxWV 203–204) and Magnificat noni toni (BuxWV 205); Attributed: Magnificat for SSATB, two violins and continuo, BuxWV Anh. 1
Cristoforo Caresana	c. 1640	1709	Magnificats a 4, a 5, a 8 and a 16, e.g. Magnificat for SAATB (1683)
Marc-Antoine; Charpentier	1643	1704	Ten Magnificats, e.g. Magnificat for soloists, chorus, 2 treble instruments and continuo H 72 (1670?); Magnificat for ATB, two treble instruments and continuo, H. 73 (1670–71); Magnificat à 8 voix et 8 instruments, H. 74 for soloists, double chorus, double orchestra and double continuo (1680); Magnificat à 3 dessus for 3 voices and continuo H 75; (1683–85); Magnificat à 4 voix sans instruments, H. 76 (1688–90); Magnificat for soloists, chorus, flutes, strings an continuo H 77 (1680–90); Magnificat for soloists, chorus flutes, strings and continuo H 78 (1680–90 ?); Troisième Magnificat à 4 voix avec instruments for soloists, chorus, flutes, strings and continuo H 79 (1690); Magnificat for 4 voices and continuo H 80(1690); Magnificat pour le Port-Royal for soloists, chorus and continuo H 81(1690–1700).
Jacques Boyvin	c. 1649	1706	Organ Suites for the Magnificat
Johann Pachelbel	1653	1706	Magnificats, e.g. in D major (P. 246); Magnificat fugues (organ); Chorale preludes: Meine Seele erhebt den Herren (Magnificat peregrini toni)
Henry Purcell	1659	1695	Magnificats ("My soul doth magnify the lord"): in B-flat major, Z 230/7 (before 1682) and in G minor, Z 231/1
Johann Kuhnau	1660	1722	Magnificat in C major for SATB soloists, SSATB chorus and orchestra
Friedrich Wilhelm; Zachow	1663	1712	Cantata Meine Seele erhebt den Herren
Pietro Torri	c. 1665	1737	Magnificat in C major à 15 et più (arranged by J. S. Bach: BWV Anh. 30)
Antonio Caldara	1670	1736	Magnificat in C major (arranged by J. S. Bach: BWV 1082)
Louis-Nicolas; Clérambault	1676	1749	Magnificat, C. 136; Magnificat du 1er ton, C. 154
Nicola Fago	1677	1745	Magnificats for SSATB/SSATB & instruments in G minor, in F minor (1710), for SSATB & orchestra in D major
Antonio Vivaldi	1678	1741	Magnificat (RV 610/610a/610b/611) RV 610: 1, 2, 3, 4, 5, 6, 7, 8, 9
Melchior Hoffmann	c. 1679	1715	Meine Seele erhebt den Herren (Hoffmann); (or J. S. Bach?) Meine Seele rühmt und preist, BWV 189
Jan Dismas Zelenka	1679	1745	Magnificats: in A minor (ZWV 106, lost), in C major (ZWV 107, c. 1727); in D major (ZWV 108, 1725)
Jean-Adam Guilain	c. 1680	after 1739	Eight Magnificats in Pièces d'Orgue pour le Magnificat (1706), of which the first four are extant (Tonus I-IV)
Johann Mattheson	1681	1764	Deutsches Magnificat a due cori (eight voices and orchestra, 1718)
Georg Philipp; Telemann	1681	1767	TWV 1:1104–1108 cantatas, e.g. Meine Seele erhebt den Herrn; Magnificat anima mea for SATBB and orchestra, TWV 9:17; Das deutsche magnificat for SATB and orchestra, TWV 9:18
Jean-François; Dandrieu	c. 1682	1738	Pièces d'orgue, Livre 1 (1739): 6 Suites in major and minor keys, each containing a six-movement Magnificat, e.g. Magnificat I from Organ Suite in D Major
Johann David; Heinichen	1683	1729	Magnificats: in G major (S. 89), in A major (S. 90), in F major (S. 91/92), in B flat major (S. 93/94/95), in E flat major (S. 96)
Christoph Graupner	1683	1760	Magnificat, GWV 1172/22 (1722); Visitation cantatas "Meine Seele erhebt den Herrn": GWV 1171/19, 1171/46
Francesco Durante	1684	1755	Magnificats e.g. in B-flat major (sometimes misattributed to Pergolesi), in A minor (1752)
Johann Sebastian; Bach	1685	1750	Magnificat BWV 243a (1723, with Christmas interpolations) – BWV 243 (1733) Gloria Patri, movement 12 of BWV 243; Cantata Meine Seel erhebt den Herren, BWV 10 (1724); Chorale harmonizations BWV 323 – 324; Schübler Chorale No. 4, BWV 648 (organ)
Nicola Porpora	c. 1686	1766	Magnificat in A minor
Johann Friedrich; Fasch	1688	1758	Magnificat, FWV H:G1
František Tůma	1704	1774	Magnificat in C major
Baldassare Galuppi	1706	1785	Four Magnificats
Bernard Aymable; Dupuy	1707	1789	Grand Magnificats No. 22, No. 23, No. 24
Michel Corrette	1707	1795	Organ Magnificats: four in Premier Livre d’Orgue, Op. 16 (1737), four in Deuxième Livre d’Orgue, Op. 26 (1750)
Franz Xaver Richter	1709	1789	Magnificat in C major for soloists, choir and orchestra
Johann Ludwig; Krebs	1713	1780	(or J. S. Bach?) Chorale prelude "Meine Seele erhebet den Herren", Fuga sopra il Magnificat, BWV 733 BWV 733
Gottfried August; Homilius	1714	1785	Four Magnificats
Carl Philipp Emanuel; Bach	1714	1788	Magnificat in D major (Wq 215 – H. 772, 1749)
Johann Ernst; Bach II	1722	1777	Meine Seele erhebt den Herrn cantatas, e.g. 1764
Claude Balbastre	1724	1799	Magnificat du 1er ton (organ)
Jean-Jacques; Beauvarlet-Charpentier	1734	1794	Organ Magnificats: 3 Magnificats, Op. 7 (c. 1777); In Journal d’orgue: No. 3 (1784), No. 9 (1784), No. 11 (1785)
Johann Christian; Bach	1735	1782	Magnificat a 8 in C major (W E20 – unfinished), Magnificat a 8 in C major (W E21), Magnificat a 4 in C major (W E22)
Anselm Viola i Valentí	1738	1798	Magnificat for Six Voices, Magnificat for Seven Voices
Guillaume Lasceux	1740	1831	Organ Magnificats (tonus I–VIII) in Annuaire de l’Organiste (1819)
Nikolaus Betscher	1745	1811	Magnificat in D major
Antonio Salieri	1750	1825	Magnificat in C major (1815); Magnificat in F major (1815)
Wolfgang Amadeus; Mozart	1756	1791	Magnificat, K. 193/186g (1774); included in vespers: Vesperae solennes de Dominica, K. 321 (1779) and Vesperae solennes de confessore, K. 339 (1780)
Franz Schubert	1797	1828	Magnificat, D. 486 (1816)
Healey Willan	1800	1968	Magnificat and Nunc dimittis in B-flat major (1906), Magnificat and Nunc dimittis in E-flat major (1912)
Felix Mendelssohn	1809	1847	Magnificat in D major (1822); Mein Herz erhebet, No. 3 of Three Motets, Op. 69 (1847)
Franz Liszt	1811	1886	Dante Symphony: Magnificat (S.109/2b) and Magnificat (pf, S.182a)
Jacques-Louis; Battmann	1818	1886	Magnificats, e.g. for organ in Le service de chapelles, Op. 274 (Paris, 1868)
Charles Gounod	1818	1893	My soul doth magnify the Lord (Magnificat in D major) for SATB choir and organ in An evening service (1872); Magnificat for soprano solo, choir and organ (1874)
César Franck	1822	1890	Magnificats in Pièces posthumes for organ/harmonium
Anton Bruckner	1824	1896	Magnificat WAB 24 (1852)
Peter Benoit	1834	1901	Magnificat for three voices and organ
Alexandre Guilmant	1837	1911	Six versets sur le Magnificat en sol majeur, No. 2 in L’Organiste pratique, Livre 2, Op. 41 (1874)
Josef Rheinberger	1839	1901	Organ Sonata No. 4, Op. 98 cites the tonus peregrinus
Pyotr Ilyich; Tchaikovsky	1840	1893	«Величитъ душа моя Господа» (Velichit dusha moya Gospoda – "My soul doth magnify the Lord"), Canticle of the Theotokos, No. 13 in All-Night Vigil (1882)
John Stainer	1840	1901	Magnificat and Nunc dimittis in B flat, Service No 3, Magnificat and Nunc dimittis in E flat, Magnificat in F
Hubert Parry	1848	1898	Magnificat, for Soprano Solo, Chorus and Orchestra, composed for the Hereford Musical Festival, 1897
Charles Villiers; Stanford	1852	1924	Magnificat and Nunc dimittis settings: in B-flat major, Op. 10, in A major, Op. 12, in F major, Op. 36, in G major, Op. 81, in C major, Op. 115, in F major "Queens' Service" (1872), in E-flat major (1873), on the 2nd and 3rd Gregorian Modes (1907); Magnificat for Eight-part Chorus, Op. 164 (1918)
Charles Wood	1866	1926	Evening Services and/or Magnificat and Nunc dimittis compositions
T. Tertius Noble	1867	1953	Evening Services in B minor and A minor (SATB and organ)
Louis Raffy	1868	1932 (?)	Magnificat (Six versets en F major), Op.39 in La Lyre Sacrée (Organ/Harmonium, c. 1924)
Charles Tournemire	1870	1939	Postludes libres pour des Antiennes de Magnificat, Op. 68 (1935, for organ)
Ralph; Vaughan Williams	1872	1958	Magnificat (1932)
Sergei Rachmaninoff	1873	1943	Величитъ душа моя Господа (My Soul Doth Magnify the Lord), No. 11 in All-Night Vigil (1915)
John Ireland	1879	1962	Evening Services and/or Magnificat and Nunc dimittis compositions, e.g. in C major, in F major
Arnold Bax	1883	1953	Magnificats: song with piano (1906), SATB choir (1948)
George Dyson	1883	1964	Evening Services in D, F (SATB and organ) and C minor (unison voices and organ)
Heitor Villa-Lobos	1887	1959	Magnificat-Alleluia, for contralto, choir, organ and orchestra (1958)
Herbert Howells	1892	1983	Evening Services including: Evening Service in G (1920), Collegium Regale (1945), Gloucester Service (1947), St Paul's Service (1951)
Herbert Sumsion	1899	1995	A major, for SATB choir and organ, D major, for trebles or SATB choir and organ, G major, for SATB choir and organ, G Major, for ATB choir and organ, G Major, for treble choir and organ
Goffredo Petrassi	1904	2003	Magnificat (Petrassi) (1939-40)
Krzysztof Penderecki	1930	2020	Magnificat (Penderecki) (1974)
Sven-David Sandström	1942		Magnificat (2005)
John Rutter	1945		Magnificat (1990)
Peter Klatzow	1945		Magnificat and Nunc Dimittis for SATB Choir with Organ
Marty Haugen	1950		Annunciation/Magnificat for Holden Evening Prayer (1985–86)
Patrick Cassidy			Kylemore Magnificat (2024)
Rory Cooney	1952		Canticle of the Turning (1990)
Peter Bannister	1966		Ökumenisches Magnificat / Ecumenical Magnificat (2016)
Peter Reulein	1966		Laudato si – Ein franziskanisches Magnificat (2016)
Philip Stopford	1977		Truro Evening Canticles, Belfast Evening Canticles, Short Service (2007), St Polycarp Service (2013
