= List of English Renaissance composers =

This is a list of English composers of the Renaissance period in alphabetical order.

- Richard Alison (c. 1560/1570–before 1610)
- John Amner (1579–1641)
- Hugh Aston (c. 1485–1558)
- Thomas Ashwell (c. 1478–after 1513)
- John Benet (fl. 1420–1450) ()
- John Bennet (c. 1575–after 1614)
- William Brade (1560–1630)
- John Browne (fl. c. 1490)
- John Bull (1562–1628)
- William Byrd (c. 1540–1623)
- Thomas Campion (1567–1620)
- J. Cooke, probably John Cooke (fl. 1417) ()
- John Cooper (c. 1570–1626)
- William Cornysh (1465–1523)
- Francis Cutting (1583–1603)
- John Danyel (c. 1564–c. 1626)
- John Dowland (1563–1626)
- John Dunstaple (c. 1390–1453)
- Michael East (c. 1580–1648)
- Giles Farnaby (c. 1563–1640)
- Robert Fayrfax (1464–1521)
- Alfonso Ferrabosco the elder (1543–1588)
- Alfonso Ferrabosco the younger (c. 1575–1628)
- Thomas Ford (c. 1580–1648)
- Walter Frye (died c. 1475)
- Ellis Gibbons (1573–1603)
- Orlando Gibbons (1583–1625)
- Anthony Holborne (c. 1545–1602)
- John Hothby (c. 1410–1487)
- Richard Hygons (c. 1435–c. 1509)
- John Jenkins (1592–1678)
- Robert Johnson (c. 1583–c. 1634)
- John Johnson (c. 1545–1594)
- Hugh Kellyk (fl. c. 1480)
- Robert Jones (c. 1577–after 1615)
- Walter Lambe (c. 1450–c. 1504)
- Nicholas Ludford (c. 1485–c. 1557)
- Thomas Lupo (1571–1627)
- John Maynard (c. 1577–c. 1633)
- John Merbecke (c. 1505- c.1585)
- Thomas Morley (c. 1558–1602)
- William Mundy (c. 1529–c. 1591)
- Richard Nicholson or Nicolson (died 1639)
- Osbert Parsley (1511 – 1585)
- Robert Parsons (c. 1535–1572)
- William Parsons (fl. 1545–1563)
- Peter Philips (c. 1560–1628)
- Leonel Power (c. 1370/1385–1445)
- Thomas Preston (died c. 1563)
- John Plummer (c. 1410–c. 1483)
- Thomas Ravenscroft (c. 1582/1592–1635)
- Thomas Robinson (c. 1560–1610)
- Philip Rosseter (c. 1568–1623)
- John Sheppard (c. 1515–1558)
- Thomas Simpson (1582–c. 1628)
- Robert Stone (1516–1613)
- John Sutton (fl. late 15th c.)
- Thomas Tallis (c. 1505–1585)
- John Taverner (c. 1490–1545)
- William Tisdale (born c. 1570)
- Thomas Tomkins (1572–1656)
- Edmund Turges may be same as Edmund Sturges (fl. c. 1507)
- Christopher Tye (c. 1505–before 1573)
- John Ward (1571–1638)
- Thomas Weelkes (1576–1623)
- Robert White (c. 1538–1574)
- John Wilbye (1574–1638)

== See also ==
- Early music of the British Isles
- List of Renaissance composers
- Chronological list of English classical composers
- List of English Baroque composers
