= Chronological list of English classical composers =

This is a chronological list of classical music composers living or working in England or originating from there. Entries are alphabetical within each year.

== Medieval ==
- Godric (c. 1065–1170)
- W. de Wycombe (fl. c. 1275–1279)
- John Hanboys (14th century); may be J. de Alto Bosco (fl. c. 1370)
- Johannes Alanus (14th century; died 1373?)
- Aleyn (fl. c. 1400)
- Byttering (fl. c. 1410–1420)
- Pycard (fl. c. 1410)
- Roy Henry (fl. c. 1410)

== Renaissance ==
- Leonel Power (c. 1370/1385–1445)
- John Dunstaple (c. 1390–1453)
- John Hothby (c. 1410–1487)
- John Plummer (c. 1410 – c. 1483)
- Henry Abyngdon (c. 1418–1497)
- William Haute (c. 1430–1497)
- Robert Morton (c. 1430 – post-1479)
- Richard Hygons (c. 1435 – c. 1509)
- Walter Frye (fl. c. 1443 – c. 1474)
- Gilbert Banester (c. 1445–1487)
- Walter Lambe (c. 1450 – c. 1504)
- John Browne (b. c. 1453, fl. c. 1490)
- Robert Fayrfax (1464–1521)
- Richard Davy (c. 1465 – c. 1538)
- William Cornysh the younger (1468–1523)
- Robert Johnson (c. 1470 – post-1554)
- Thomas Ashewell (c. 1478 – post-1513)
- John Redford (c. 1486–1547)
- Nicholas Ludford (c. 1490–1557)
- Henry VIII (1491–1547)
- John Taverner (1495–1545)
- Christopher Tye (c. 1505 – c. 1572)
- Anthony de Countie (died 1579)
- Thomas Tallis (c. 1505–1585)
- John Merbecke (c. 1510 – c. 1585)
- John Sheppard (c. 1515–1559)
- Richard Farrant (c. 1525–1580)
- William Mundy (c. 1528 – pre-1591)
- Robert Parsons (c. 1535–1572)
- Robert White (c. 1538–1574)
- William Byrd (c. 1540–1623)
- Anthony Holborne (c. 1545–1602)
- Francis Cutting (c. 1550–1595/1596)
- John Mundy (c. 1555–1630)
- Thomas Morley (1557–1602)
- Peter Philips (c. 1560–1628)
- William Brade (1560–1630)
- John Bull (c. 1562–1628)
- John Dowland (1563–1626)
- Giles Farnaby (c. 1563–1640)
- William Leighton (c. 1565–1622)
- Thomas Campion (1567–1620)
- Philip Rosseter (1568–1623)
- Tobias Hume (c. 1569–1645)
- John Coprario (John Cooper; Giovanni Coperario) (1570–1626)
- John Farmer (c. 1570 – c. 1601)
- Thomas Lupo (1571–1627)
- Martin Peerson (1571/1573–1650)
- John Ward (1571–1638)
- Daniel Bacheler (1572–1618)
- Thomas Tomkins (1572–1656)
- Ellis Gibbons (1573–1603)
- John Wilbye (1574–1638)
- John Bennet (c. 1575 – post-1614)
- Thomas Cutting (late 16th c. lutenist to Arbella Stuart, Christian IV and Henry Frederick, Prince of Wales)
- Alfonso Ferrabosco the younger (c. 1575–1628)
- Thomas Weelkes (1576–1623)
- John Maynard (c. 1577 – c. 1633)
- Richard Dering (c. 1580–1630)
- Michael East (c. 1580–1648)
- Thomas Ford (c. 1580–1648)
- Orlando Gibbons (1583–1625)
- Robert Johnson (1583–1633)
- Thomas Robinson (c. 1588 – post-1609)

== Baroque ==
- Nicholas Lanier (1588–1666)
- Richard Mico (1590–1661)
- John Jenkins (1592–1678)
- Henry Lawes (1595–1662)
- John Wilson (1595–1674)
- John Hilton (1599–1657)
- William Lawes (1602–1645)
- Christopher Simpson (c. 1602/1606–1669)
- William Child (1606–1697)
- Thomas Brewer (1611 – c. 1660)
- Henry Cooke (c. 1616–1672)
- Christopher Gibbons (1615–1676)
- Matthew Locke (c. 1621–1677)
- John Banister (c. 1624/1630–1679)
- Pelham Humphrey (1647–1674)
- Michael Wise (1647–1687)
- John Blow (1649–1708)
- William Turner (1651–1740)
- Henry Purcell (1659–1695)
- Daniel Purcell (1664–1717)
- Johann Christoph Pepusch (John Christopher, 1667–1742)
- John Eccles (1668–1735)
- Henry Eccles (1670–1742)
- Jeremiah Clarke (c. 1674–1707)
- John Weldon (1676–1736)
- William Croft (1678–1727)
- William Corbett (1680–1748)
- Abiell Whichello (1683–1747)
- George Frideric Handel (1685–1759)
- Thomas Roseingrave (1688–1766)
- William Babell (1689/1690–1723)
- Robert Woodcock (c. 1690–1728)
- Maurice Greene (1696–1755)
- Richard Jones (late 17th c. – 1744)
- Joseph Gibbs (1699–1788)

== Classical era ==
- Thomas Chilcot (c. 1707–1766)
- Charles Avison (1709–1770)
- Thomas Arne (1710–1778)
- Thomas Gladwin (1710–1799)
- William Boyce (1711–1779)
- John Hebden (1712–1765)
- John Stanley (1712–1786)
- James Nares (1715–1783)
- John Garth (1721–1810)
- Charles Burney (1726–1814)
- Capel Bond (1730–1790)
- William Jackson (1730–1803)
- Thomas Sanders Dupuis (1733–1796)
- Thomas Linley the elder (1733–1795)
- Benjamin Cooke (1734–1793)
- John Bennett (c. 1735–1784)
- Philip Hayes (1738–1797)
- William Herschel (1738–1822)
- Michael Arne (1740/1741–1786)
- Samuel Arnold (1740–1802)
- Samuel Webbe (1740–1816)
- James Hook (1746–1827)
- William Shield (1748–1829)
- John Stafford Smith (1750–1836)
- John Marsh (1752–1828)
- Thomas Linley the younger (1756–1778)
- Stephen Storace (1762–1796)
- Matthew Camidge (1764–1844)
- John Addison (c. 1765–1844)
- Thomas Attwood (1765–1838)
- Samuel Wesley (1766–1837)

== Romantic ==
- William Crotch (1775–1847)
- Thomas Adams (1785–1858)
- George Pinto (1785–1806)
- Sir Henry Bishop (1787–1856)
- Cipriani Potter (1792–1871)
- Robert Lucas de Pearsall (1795–1856)
- John Goss (1800–1880)
- John Lodge Ellerton (1801–1873)
- Elias Parish Alvars (1808–1849)
- Samuel Sebastian Wesley (1810–1876)
- George Alexander Macfarren (1813–1887)
- William Christian Sellé (1813–1898)
- Henry Smart (1813–1879)
- William Sterndale Bennett (1816–1875)
- Henry Charles Litolff (1818–1891)
- Edmund Chipp (1823–1886)
- Henry Hiles (1826–1904)
- John Baptiste Calkin (1827–1905)
- George Tolhurst (1827–1877)
- Francis Edward Bache (1833–1858)
- Ebenezer Prout (1835–1909)
- Joseph Barnby (1838–1896)
- Alice Mary Smith (1839–1884)
- Sydney Smith (1839–1889)
- John Stainer (1840–1901)
- Michael Maybrick (Stephen Adams) (1841–1913)
- Arthur Sullivan (1842–1900)
- Hubert Parry (1848–1918)
- Arthur Goring Thomas (1850–1892)
- Charles Villiers Stanford (1852-1924)
- Frederick Corder (1852–1932)
- Frederic Cowen (1852–1935)
- Bertram Luard-Selby (1853–1918)
- Maude Valérie White (French-born, 1855–1937)
- Frederic Cliffe (1857–1931)
- Rosalind Ellicott (1857–1924)
- Edward Elgar (1857–1934)
- Isidore de Lara (1858–1935)
- Ethel Smyth (1858–1944)
- John Henry Maunder (1858–1920)
- Basil Harwood (1859–1949)

== Modern ==
- Frederick Delius (1862–1934)
- Edward German (1862–1936)
- Liza Lehmann (1862–1918)
- Arthur Somervell (1863–1937)
- Edwin Lemare (1866–1934)
- Granville Bantock (1868–1946)
- Haldane Stewart (1868–1942)
- Walford Davies (1869–1941)
- Ralph Vaughan Williams (1872–1958)
- Ethel Barns (1874–1948)
- Gustav Holst (1874–1934)
- Samuel Coleridge-Taylor (1875–1912)
- Donald Tovey (1875–1940)
- Havergal Brian (1876–1972)
- William Hurlstone (1876–1906)
- Thomas Dunhill (1877–1946)
- Henry Balfour Gardiner (1877–1950)
- Roger Quilter (1877–1953)
- Rutland Boughton (1878–1960)
- Adam Carse (1878–1958)
- Joseph Holbrooke (1878–1958)
- Theodore Holland (1878–1947)
- Frank Bridge (1879–1941)
- John Ireland (1879–1962)
- Cyril Scott (1879–1970)
- Edgar Bainton (1880–1956)
- John Foulds (1880–1939)
- Hubert Bath (1883–1945)
- Arnold Bax (1883–1953)
- George Dyson (1883–1964)
- William Henry Harris (1883–1973)
- Lord Berners (1883–1950)
- York Bowen (1884–1961)
- George Butterworth (1885–1916)
- Ernest Farrar (1885–1918)
- Rebecca Clarke (1886–1979)
- Eric Coates (1886–1957)
- Armstrong Gibbs (1889–1960)
- Ivor Gurney (1890–1937)
- Arthur Bliss (1891–1975)
- Herbert Howells (1892–1983)
- Kaikhosru Shapurji Sorabji (1892–1988)
- Eugene Goossens (1893–1962)
- Peter Warlock (1894–1930)
- Ernest John Moeran (1894–1950)
- Gordon Jacob (1895–1984)
- George Thalben-Ball (1896–1987)
- William Baines (1899–1922)
- Herbert Sumsion (1899–1995)
- Alan Bush (1900–1995)
- Gerald Finzi (1901–1956)
- Victor Hely-Hutchinson (1901–1947)
- Edmund Rubbra (1901–1986)
- William Walton (1902–1983)
- Lennox Berkeley (1903–1989)
- Leighton Lucas (1903–1982)
- Robin Milford (1903–1959)
- Thomas Pitfield (1903–1999)
- Percy Whitlock (1903–1946)
- Richard Addinsell (1904–1977)
- William Alwyn (1905–1985)
- Constant Lambert (1905–1951)
- Walter Leigh (1905–1942)
- Alan Rawsthorne (1905–1971)
- Michael Tippett (1905–1998)
- Arnold Cooke (1906–2005)
- Eric Fenby (1906–1997)
- Benjamin Frankel (1906–1973)
- Elisabeth Lutyens (1906–1983)
- Roy Douglas (1907–2015)
- Imogen Holst (1907–1984)
- Elizabeth Maconchy (1907–1994)
- Brian Easdale (1909–1995)
- Ronald Binge (1910–1979)
- Stanley Bate (1911–1959)
- Phyllis Tate (1911–1987)
- Percy M. Young (1912–2004)
- Benjamin Britten (1913–1976)
- George Lloyd (1913–1998)
- Harold Truscott (1914–1992)
- William Lloyd Webber (1914–1982)
- Humphrey Searle (1915–1982)
- Denis ApIvor (1916–2004)
- Bernard Stevens (1916–1983)
- Richard Arnell (1917–2009)
- John Gardner (1917–2011)
- Francis Jackson (1917—2022)
- John W. Duarte (1919–2004)
- Geoffrey Bush (1920–1998)
- Peter Racine Fricker (1920–1990)
- Malcolm Arnold (1921–2006)
- Ruth Gipps (1921–1999)
- Robert Simpson (1921–1997)
- Peter Wishart (1921–1984)
- Raffaello de Banfield (1922–2008)
- Doreen Carwithen (1922–2003)
- Arthur Butterworth (1923–2014)
- Madeleine Dring (1923–1977)
- Stephen Dodgson (1924–2013)
- Angela Morley (1924–2009)
- Buxton Orr (1924–1997)
- Ernest Tomlinson (1924–2015)
- Daphne Oram (1925–2003)
- Christopher Shaw (1925–1995)
- Arthur Wills (1926–2020)
- Wilfred Josephs (1927–1997)
- John Joubert (1927–2019)
- Graham Whettam (1927–2007)
- Geoffrey Winters (born 1928)
- Kenneth Leighton (1929–1988)
- Betty Roe (1930-2026)
- Alexander Goehr (1932–2024)
- George Newson (1932-2024)
- Justin Connolly (1933–2020)
- Harrison Birtwistle (1934–2022)
- Peter Maxwell Davies (1934–2016)
- Peter Dickinson (1934-2023)
- Anthony Gilbert (composer) (1934-2023)
- Nicholas Maw (1935–2009)
- Richard Rodney Bennett (1936–2012)
- Nigel Brooks (1936-2024)
- Cornelius Cardew (1936–1981)
- Patrick Gowers (1936–2014)
- Colin Mawby (1936–2019)
- Anthony Payne (1936–2021)
- John White (1936–2024)
- David Bedford (1937–2011)
- Gordon Crosse (1937–2021)
- Edwin Roxburgh (born 1937)
- Howard Blake (born 1938)
- Michael Parsons (born 1938)
- Christopher Steel (1938–1991)
- Andrew Carter (1939–2026)
- Jonathan Harvey (1939–2012)
- John McCabe (1939–2015)
- Patric Standford (1939–2014)
- Geoffrey Burgon (1941–2010)
- Derek Bourgeois (1941–2017)
- Timothy Salter (born 1942)
- Gavin Bryars (born 1943)
- Edward Cowie (born 1943)
- Frank Denyer (born 1943)
- Brian Ferneyhough (born 1943)
- Robin Holloway (born 1943)
- Bill Hopkins (1943–1981)
- David Matthews (born 1943)
- Keith Emerson (1944–2016)
- Michael Nyman (born 1944)
- John Tavener (1944–2013)

== Contemporary ==
- Clarence Barlow (1945–2023)
- John Rutter (born 1945)
- Michael Finnissy (born 1946)
- Colin Matthews (born 1946)
- Giles Swayne (born 1946)
- Paul Patterson (born 1947)
- Hugh Shrapnel (born 1947)
- Howard Skempton (born 1947)
- Michael Berkeley (born 1948)
- Diana Burrell (born 1948)
- Grayston Ives (born 1948)
- John Casken (born 1949)
- Sam Richards (born 1949)
- Dave Smith (born 1949)
- Philip Wilby (born 1949)
- Nicholas Sackman (born 1950)
- Ronald Corp (1951–2025)
- Cecilia McDowall (born 1951)
- Paul Spicer (born 1952)
- Judith Bingham (born 1952)
- Oliver Knussen (1952–2018)
- Dominic Muldowney (born 1952)
- Patrick Doyle (born 1953)
- Peter McGarr (born 1953)
- Sarah Rodgers (born 1953)
- Robert Saxton (born 1953)
- Richard Blackford (born 1954)
- Benedict Mason (born 1954)
- Judith Weir (born 1954)
- John Woolrich (born 1954)
- Ian Venables (born 1955)
- Sally Beamish (born 1956)
- Philip Grange (born 1956)
- Steve Elcock (born 1957)
- Francis Pott (composer) (born 1957)
- Janet Wheeler (born 1957)
- Howard Goodall (born 1958)
- Lionel Sainsbury (born 1958)
- Patrick Hawes (born 1958)
- Simon Holt (born 1958)
- Errollyn Wallen (born 1958)
- Joanna MacGregor (born 1959)
- Jonathan Dove (born 1959)
- Steve Martland (1959–2013)
- John Palmer (born 1959)
- Martin Butler (composer) (born 1960)
- Jocelyn Pook (born 1960)
- Peter Seabourne (born 1960)
- George Benjamin (born 1960)
- Mark-Anthony Turnage (born 1960)
- Paul Carr (born 1961)
- David Sawer (born 1961)
- Peter Copley (born 1962)
- Andrew Toovey (born 1962)
- Jack Gibbons (born 1962)
- Andrew Glover-Whitley (born 1962)
- Philip Cashian (born 1963)
- Graham Fitkin (born 1963)
- Michael Zev Gordon (born 1963)
- John Pickard (born 1963)
- John Powell (born 1963)
- James Whitbourn (born 1963)
- Debbie Wiseman (born 1963)
- Ivan Moody (1964–2024)
- Matthew Taylor (born 1964)
- Julian Anderson (born 1967)
- Rebecca Saunders (born 1967)
- Joe Cutler (born 1968)
- Roxanna Panufnik (born 1968)
- James Francis Brown (born 1969)
- Patrick Nunn (born 1969)
- Jonathan Powell (1969–2025)
- Thomas Adès (born 1971)
- Joby Talbot (born 1971)
- David Jennings (born 1972)
- Tansy Davies (born 1973)
- Andrew March (born 1973)
- Julian Cochran (born 1974)
- Sophie Viney (born 1974)
- Tim Benjamin (born 1975)
- Wieland Hoban (born 1978)
- Luke Bedford (born 1978)
- Charlotte Bray (born 1982)
- Sasha Siem (born 1984)
- Freya Waley-Cohen (born 1989)
- Lucy Armstrong (born 1991)
- Anna Appleby (born 1993)
- Grace Evangeline Mason (born 1994)

== See also ==
- Classical music of the United Kingdom
