= Gymel =

In medieval and early Renaissance English polyphonic music, gymel (also gimel or gemell) is the technique of temporarily dividing up one voice part, usually an upper one, into two parts of equal range, but singing different music. Often the two voices sing a passage of intricate polyphony, beginning and finally converging on a unison, and often, but not always, the other voices drop out for a time.

While the earliest use of gymel seems to have been around the mid-14th century, the earliest notated gymels survive from approximately 1430. It is probable that some earlier notated examples have been lost, since the vast majority of English manuscript sources from before the 1530s were destroyed during the Dissolution of the Monasteries by Henry VIII. Indeed, the earliest surviving notated examples are from continental sources.

The significance of the development of gymel is three-fold. First, that a single voice part could be split into two indicates that the music of the time was being sung with multiple voices on a part, as opposed to the practice of secular polyphony at the time, in which there was only one voice on a part. Second, considerable virtuosity is required for many of the surviving examples of gymel, indicating a rise in the singing standards in England in the 14th and 15th centuries. Third, the use of gymel shows that composers were becoming aware of the importance of textural contrast as a structural device; this is one of the critical distinctions between medieval and Renaissance music, a distinction which would carry forward to the present day.

It also seems that many times gymel was improvised by skilled singers. An anonymous treatise of around 1450, known as the Pseudo-Chilston, includes the instruction: "And alwey beginne and ende thi Countertenor in a 5 [the interval of a fifth]. And thi Countergemel begynne and ende in unisoun." (1) That the singers would be given instruction on which intervals to use to begin and end indicates that they were not reading from written music, but improvising.

Composers of gymel include John Dunstaple, William Cornysh, Richard Davy, John Browne, and (much later) Thomas Tallis, Robert White, and Robert Parsons, as well as the numerous named and anonymous composers in sources such as the Eton Choirbook and the Caius Choirbook, among the few collections of English music to survive from the 15th century.

== See also ==
- Fauxbourdon
- Gimell Records

== References and further reading ==
- Ernest H. Sanders: "Gymel", Grove Music Online ed. L. Macy (Accessed January 16, 2005), Grove Music Online
- Richard H. Hoppin, Medieval Music. New York, W.W. Norton & Co., 1978. ISBN 0-393-09090-6
- The New Grove Dictionary of Music and Musicians, ed. Stanley Sadie. 20 vol. London, Macmillan Publishers Ltd., 1980. ISBN 1-56159-174-2
- Gustave Reese, Music in the Renaissance. New York, W.W. Norton & Co., 1954. ISBN 0-393-09530-4
- (1) Manfred Bukofzer, Geschichte des englischen Diskants und des Fauxbourdons nach den theoretischen Quellen. Strasbourg, 1936. (While the book is in German, the quotations are in late middle to early modern English.)
