= Richard Fawkyner =

Richard Fawkyner, identified as Fawkyner in the Eton Choirbook (fl. 15th c.) was a composer who lived at the time of the English votive style.

== Life ==
There were several musicians in England known as Fawkyner at the time, but the most likely identification for the contributor in the Eton Choirbook is Richard Fawkyner, who was admitted into Cambridge in 1478. Richard Fawkyner later became a chaplain at King's College from 1482 to 1484.

A more unlikely candidate is the Reverend John Fawkyner, rector of Horncastle in the 1490s.

== Works ==
- Gaude rosa sine spina for five voices.
- Gaude virgo salutata for five voices.
- Salve regina (lost)
