= Gimel (disambiguation) =

Gimel may refer to:

- Gimel, Switzerland, a municipality in the canton of Vaud
- Gimel-les-Cascades, France
- Gimel, the third letter of the Semitic abjads
- Yom Gimel, or simply Gimel, a day of sick leave in the Israel Defense Forces
- Plan Gimel (Plan C), a general military plan worked out by the Zionist paramilitary organization Haganah in 1946, before Plan Dalet
- Gymel, the technique of temporarily dividing up one voice part, usually an upper one, into two parts of equal range, but singing different music
- Gimel, The High Priestess who is one of the 22 trump cards (Major Arcana) in tarot
- Gimel function, a function in set theory
- Gimel (game), a board game published in 1980
- Gimell Records, Tallis Scholars' recording label
