= Nicholas Huchin =

English composer

Nicholas Huchin, also Huchyn (d. after 1504) was a composer of early Renaissance music, specifically in the English votive style.

== Life ==
Huchin was associated with Holy Trinity College of Arundel Priory. From 1466-7, or 1476-7, he was a chorister. He was a lay clerk of the college from 1485-1504, serving as an instructor from 1490-1491.

== Works ==
- Ascendit Christus hodie (Eton Choirbook)
- Salve regina mater misericordia (Eton Choirbook).
