= William Brygeman =

William Brygeman (c. 1485 – after 1524) was a composer of the English votive style whose works are found in the Eton Choirbook.

== Life ==
Brygeman was lay clerk at Eton College from 1503–1504. He was later conduct from 1513–1515. Brygeman was parish clerk at All Saints' Church, Bristol, where he bequeathed a collection of polyphonic manuscripts in 1524.

== Works ==
- Magnificat for 5 voices
- Salve Regina for 5 voices (fragment)
