= Mychelson =

Composer of the English votive style

Mychelson (fl. 15th c.) is a composer of the English votive style represented in the Eton Choirbook.

== Life ==
Mychelson either refers to John Mychelson or Robert Mychelson. John Mychelson was employed in the household of John de Vere, earl of Oxford, in 1490. He was then vicar choral at St. George's, Windsor, in 1492–1493.

Robert Mychelson was a lay clerk at St. George's, Windsor, from 1492 to 1504. He joined the Fraternity of St Nicholas in 1493.

== Works ==
- Magnificat
