= John Baldwyn =

John Baldwyn, known in the Eton Choirbook index as Baldwyn, or at Tattershall as Bawldwyn (c. 1438 - after 1500) was a composer who lived at the time of the English votive style. None of his compositions survive.

== Life ==
Baldwyn was born in Cheshunt. He was a chorister at Eton College from 1448 to 1452. He was admitted scholar at King's College Cambridge in 1452, holding a bachelor of music as Fellow in 1471. He is last recorded as a vicar choral at Wells Cathedral 1486–1500.

== Works ==
- Gaude flori virginali for seven voices (Eton, Tattershall, lost)
