= John Sygar =

16th c. English Renaissance composer

John Sygar, identified as Sygar in the Eton Choirbook (fl. 16th century), was a copyist, singer and composer of the English votive style.

== Life ==
Sygar was likely John Sygar, a conduct of King's College Cambridge from 1499-1501 and 1508-1514. He copied music for the chapel there in 1500, 1508 and 1511. Sygar possibly had close connections to the city of Cambridge itself, as it has been suggested that he is the relative of the butcher "Sygar" mentioned in college accounts in 1501. However, like other composers of his generation, Sygar's birthplace and personal details cannot be verified for certain. Sygar has one surviving work in the Eton Choirbook.

== Works ==
- Magnificat for four voices.
