= William Horwood (composer) =

British composer

William Horwood, also Horewud, was an English polyphonic vocal composer in the late-medieval period (c. 1430 – 1484). He was an early proponent of the English votive style and represents the first stage of its development in the Eton Choirbook, contributing three complete pieces and one fragment to the document. In 1470, he was a singer at Lincoln Cathedral, in 1476, he was a vicar choral at Lincoln, and from 1477 until 1484, he was the Cathedral choirmaster. There is also one incomplete piece attributed to Horwood in the fragmentary York mass manuscript, Borthwick Institute MS Mus.1; however, Theodor Dumitrescu in his edition of the mass manuscript suggests this may be a different composer with the same surname.

The survival of these large-scale pieces makes Horwood the most important representative we have of the period between Dunstaple and early Tudor composers such as Fayrfax and William Cornysh.

Horwood's "Magnificat secundi toni a 5" bears a strong resemblance to compositions of his near contemporary Josquin des Prez (c. 1440–1521), so much so that he might easily be mistaken for Josquin upon first audition. No mention is made of Horwood among the listing of Josquin's contemporaries in Grout; neither is the Eton Choirbook mentioned in Grout.

A very scanty on-line article – only a thumbnail description of the composer – is present on (FM 99.5, New York) WBAI producer Chris Whent's Here of a Sunday Morning site. (The link Partial William Horwood Discography has no content.)

== Works ==
- Eton 17. f. 30v-32: Salve regina mater misericordiae
- Eton 36. f. 74v-76: Gaude flore virginali
- Eton 37. f. 76v-77v: Gaude virgo mater Christi (incomplete)
- Eton 71. f. 111v-113: Magnificat
- York manuscript: Kyrie (incomplete)

== Discography ==
- Magnificat a 5 – Pomerium, "Creator of the Stars: Christmas Music from Earlier Times", reissued as "Old World Christmas", Archiv Produktion
- Magnificat a 5 – Huelgas Ensemble, "The Eton Choirbook", DHM
- Gaude flore virginali – Opus Anglicanum, "Mediaeval Carols", Herald
- Gaude flore virginali – Christ Church Cathedral Choir, "The Sun Most Radiant (Eton Choirbook vol. 4)", Avie
