= Gilbert Banester =

English composer and poet

Gilbert Banester (also Banaster, Banastir, Banastre; c. 1445 – 1487) was an English composer and poet of Flemish influences. He was a significant and influential proponent of the English votive style.

Possibly a native of London, he was Master of the Children of the Chapel Royal from 1478 to 1490. His works are found in a number of Tudor manuscript collections of church music, including the Pepys Manuscript; there is also an antiphon by his hand in the Eton Choirbook. Stylistically the work is similar to those of William Horwood in the same book but is unusual in that it is written to a prose text. Two poems have been ascribed to Banester, the Miracle of St Thomas of 1467 and a translation of Boccaccio, dating to 1450, that is the first known in the English language.

Little else is known of Banester's life. He was recorded as the "king's servant" in 1471. In addition, it is known that Edward IV provided him with corrodies for two Abbeys, and he was made a Gentleman of the Chapel Royal in 1475. In 1478, he became master of the choristers. Banester's O Maria et Elizabeth, the only contribution of his to the Eton choirbook, is more florid than his other works and employs a lengthy text concerning the motherhood of Mary and Elizabeth, but ends with a prayer for the king. The addition "Bendicam te Domine", the third antiphon for Lauds on the Sunday of the wedding of Henry VII and Elizabeth of York for the work's cantus firmus, means that it was likely composed to commemorate their marriage in 1486. He died in 1487.
