= Robert Hacomblen =

- Born: London

Robert Hacomblen (also spelt Hacomplaynt, Hacumplaynt, Hacomplayne, Hacomblene, Hacumblen) (1455 or 1456, London – 1528, Cambridge), was provost of King's College, Cambridge.

== Career and legacy ==
Hacomblen was educated at Eton, where he was admitted a scholar of King's College, Cambridge in 1472. He served the office of proctor in 1483, and succeeded Richard Lincoln as vicar of Prescot in Lancashire on 7 Aug. 1492. He became D.D. in 1507, and in 1509, on the death of Dr. Richard Hatton, was elected to the provostship of his college at Cambridge, which he held for nineteen years. His date of death is uncertain and has been suggested as 5 or 8 September or 21 October 1528 (the last of which being the date he possibly signed a will).

As provost he was party to the contract entered into in 1526 for filling the windows of King's College chapel with stained glass. He gave the brass lectern still in use in the chapel, which bears his name. The Lectern is fitted up the chantry, the second from the west on the south side, in which, in accordance with his will, dated 21 Oct. 1528, he was buried. His memorial brass represents him in doctor's robes, with the legend issuing from his mouth, "Vulnera Christe tua mihi dulcis sint medicina", and penitential prayers on the label running round the slab. In the window is his shield in painted glass, "vert, a saltire between four lilies slipped argent".

Hacomblen was a man of learning of the standard of his day, and of some accomplishments, being the probable author of a musical setting of Salve Regina for Eton Chapel, c. 1500 preserved in the Eton Choirbook and there attributed to Hacomplaynt. He was the author of commentaries on the first seven books and part of the eighth of the Ethics of Aristotle, which "continues to slumber in manuscript in the library of his college", the text being the traditional Latin text of the schoolmen. Some laudatory verses by Hartwell, who entered the college in 1559, are written at the foot of the manuscript.
