= Edmund Turges =

English composer

Edmund Turges (c.1440-after 1501) thought to be also Edmund Sturges (fl. 1507–1508) was an English Renaissance era composer who came from Petworth, was ordained by Bishop Ridley in 1550, and joined the Fraternity of St. Nicholas (the London Guild of Parish Clerks) in 1469.

Several works are listed in the name of Turges in the Eton Choirbook, which survived Henry VIII's Dissolution of the Monasteries between 1536 and 1541. Turges also has a Magnificat extant in the Caius Choirbook, and compositions in the Fayrfax Boke. A Kyrie and Gloria are ascribed to Sturges in the Ritson Manuscript. At least two masses and three Magnificat settings have been lost, as well as eight six-part pieces listed in the 1529 King's College Inventory.

It is quite possible that his setting of 'Gaude flore virginali' was written with the choir of New College, Oxford in mind, especially since a man by the name of Sturges served as a chaplain in the choir between 1507-08. Its unorthodox vocal scoring for TrTrATB suggests the choral forces found in the college at the time where the boys (16 in total) outnumbered the men (of whom there were likely to have been no more than four). The high treble lines indicate that Turges was an early proponent of the English votive style.

== Works ==
Selected works include:

- Gaude flore virginali
- Magnificat
- Kyrie
- Gloria
