= John Sutton (composer) =

Fellow of Magdalen College, Oxford

John Sutton (fl. late 15th century) was one of the composers of the Eton Choirbook. Sutton was a Fellow of Magdalen College, Oxford, in 1476; one year later he was elected for the fellowship at Eton College; there are no more references to his name in the Eton records after 1479. He may have been the same "Sutton" who graduated MusB at Cambridge in 1489.

Only one work by him survives, a Salve Regina in seven parts.
