= Janet Wheeler =

British composer and choral conductor

Janet Wheeler (born 1957) is a British composer and choral conductor, based in Saffron Walden, Essex.

== Early life ==
Wheeler was a junior exhibitioner at the Guildhall School of Music and Drama from the age of 10. She read music at Newnham College, Cambridge. After graduating, Wheeler became a secondary school music teacher, then became a music producer for BBC Schools radio primary music before specialising entirely in conducting and composing.

== Composer ==
Wheeler's music has been sung by I Fagiolini, Gloucester Cathedral Choir, the National Youth Choirs of Great Britain, the Chapel Choir of University College, Oxford, Sonoro Choir, ORA Singers, Farnham Youth Choir, Harlequin Chamber Choir, Psallite Women's Choir, Imperial College Choir, Southampton Philharmonic Choir the Chandos Chamber Choir and St Bride's Choir at St Bride's Church. In 2018 the London International Choral Conducting Competition commissioned The Cries of Music with words written by Welsh librettist and poet Euan Tait.

Wheeler's music has been sung at the Three Choirs Festival and at the Leith Hill Music Festival.

Wheeler was commissioned by her alma mater Newnham College, Cambridge to write Better is Wisdom than Weapons of War, inspired by the famous words from the college's suffrage banner, for the 100th anniversary of the Newnham Roll in 2018.

As part of Sonoro Choir's 2019 Choral Inspirations project, Wheeler was commissioned to compose a new piece alongside five other British composers: Cheryl Frances-Hoad, Will Todd, Russell Hepplewhite, Joanna Marsh and James McCarthy. Her piece, Beati quorum via, was inspired by Charles Villiers Stanford's piece of the same name.

Wheeler publishes her own compositions under the MazeMusic imprint. Hal Leonard de Haske publish some of her lighter pieces and Novello published her introit We Sing to God, the Spring of Mirth. The anthem Alleluia, I heard a voice is published in the Multitude of Voyces: Sacred Music by Women Composers anthology published in 2019 by Multitude of Voyces, and currently distributed by Stainer & Bell.

== Conductor ==
Wheeler founded the chamber choir Granta Chorale in 2007 and since 2010 she has also conducted SignuptoSing, the Saffron Walden Youth Choir. She also conducts the Chamber Choir at Saffron Walden County High School.

== Awards ==
In 2016, Wheeler won the Friends of Cathedral Music Diamond Jubilee Introit competition for We Sing to God, the Spring of Mirth. In 2017, she won the Hendrix Candlelight Carol Competition for her piece Behold, I Come and also the Leith Hill Musical Festival Composition Competition for Seventy Three.
