= Robert Wylkynson =

English composer

Robert Wylkynson (sometimes Wilkinson) (ca. 1450 – Eton after 1515) was one of the composers of the Eton Choirbook. Wylkynson became parish clerk of Eton in 1496, then in 1500 he was promoted to Informator - the master of the choristers.

Only four works survive:

- 2x Salve Regina
- Jesus autem transiens/Credo in Deum à 13
- motet O virgo prudentissima (fragmentary)

But these works show Wylkynson to have been "an extremely ambitious composer and a more than competent one."

== Recordings ==
- Salve Regina Eton Choirbook Vol. I The Sixteen, dir. Harry Christophers
- Salve Regina I & II. Music from The Eton Choirbook Vol. IV Christ Church Cathedral Choir, Oxford, dir. Stephen Darlington
- Jesus autem transiens/Credo in Deum à 13. Eton Choirbook Vol. III The Sixteen, dir. Harry Christophers
- Jesus autem transiens/Credo in Deum à 13. on À 40 Voix.Huelgas Ensemble, dir. Paul Van Nevel. HMC 801954
- Jesus autem transiens/Credo in Deum à 13. Eton Choirbook Tonus Peregrinus
