= Anthony de Countie =

Composer and lutenist

- Died: 1579
- Other names: Anthony Conti; Anthony de Conti; Anthony de County
- Occupations: Composer, lutenist
- Era: Renaissance
- Spouse: Lucretia

Anthony de Countie, also called Anthony Conti, Anthony de Conti and Anthony de County, (died 1579), was a Renaissance composer and lutenist, active in the 16th century at the Tudor court in England, and one of the principal lutenists of the Elizabethan era.

== Origins ==
According to David Lasocki, Anthony de Countie may have been a Spanish musician of Jewish origin, but he is more likely to have been an Italian because he had an Italian wife, Lucretia, and he lived with another Italian, Francis Jetto, between 1565 and 1571.

== Career ==
Anthony de Countie was employed as a lutenist at the English court from 1550 to 1579. He occupied the post of "royal lewter" during the successive reigns of three sovereigns of the House of Tudor, namely Edward VI, Mary I, and Elizabeth I, though there is a period (1557–1564) during which his movements are not accounted for. The Elizabethan court could boast of numerous musicians during the 1560s and 1570s, but only de Countie is specifically identified as a lutenist. He is also, perhaps mistakenly, listed among the players of the virginals.

At Anthony de Countie's death in 1579, John Johnson was engaged to replace him as "royal lewter", thanks to the backing of Robert Dudley, Earl of Leicester.

== Works ==
No music has survived which can be attributed to de Countie with certainty.

== Discography ==
- Paul O'Dette
  - The Royal Lewters - Harmonia Mundi 2002
