= Ludwig Daser =

German renaissance composer (c. 1526–1589)

- Born: c. 1526; Munich
- Died: 27 March 1589 (aged 62–63); Stuttgart
- Occupations: kapellmeister, composer
- Spouse: Magdalena von Haffner

Ludwig Daser (c. 1526 – 27 March 1589) was a German renaissance composer and choirmaster. His career is marked by the Reformation and Counter-Reformation struggles of his time. A noted composer in his day, Daser has been largely overshadowed by Orlande de Lassus, who replaced him in Munich.

== Biography ==
Daser was born in Munich near the year 1526, the son of fisherman Achacius Daser. At an early age he joined the Bavarian Hofkapelle in Munich. There he received formal education in theology and music, the latter as a pupil of Ludwig Senfl. An ordained priest, he entered the Bayerische Hofkapelle in 1550 alongside Mattheus Le Maistre. He became the Munich court choirmaster in 1552, replacing Andreas Zauner. Daser earned extra money as a music copyist while he held the Kapellmeister position. In addition to conducting and composing, Daser was responsible for training boys for the choir, and for hiring vocal and instrumental musicians for the chapel. His position afforded him a salary, food and clothing allowances, and monetary bonuses on various occasions, not limited to the New Year. Le Maistre's sudden departure from Munich in 1554 caused Daser to also assume duties as court composer. Although the court of Albert V, Duke of Bavaria was decidedly Catholic, Daser's predilection towards Protestantism was stated in his Missa Ave Marie, where in the Credo section he added a word to the confession of faith "Et in unum Dominum nostrum Jesum Christum", at the time a clear signal of intent. In 1556 Orlande de Lassus arrived at the Munich court. The universal acclaim accorded to de Lassus caused discomfiture for Daser, as his role as primary musician became supplanted by de Lassus.

In the 1560s, Albert V began actively pursuing a course of establishing Catholicism at his court. There is some controversy surrounding Daser's activities between 1563 and 1572. Daser was subject to an Inquisition, and was shortly removed from his position of Kapellmeister in 1563 on grounds of "ill health". Iain Fenlon suggests that he was found to be "Lutheran", and that the "ill health" was a pretext upon which allowed the Duke to give Daser a retirement pension of considerate amount. Bernhold Schmid posits that Daser really did suffer from poor health for a period of time. In any case, he was replaced by Orlande de Lassus. Nevertheless, Daser's music continued to be performed at the Munich chapel under de Lassus. Daser moved to Stuttgart in 1572 and became kapellmeister there, openly converting as he found no resistance to his Lutheranism from the Duke of Württemberg. Daser's "retirement" pension from Bavaria was thus revoked. He remained Kapellmeister at Stuttgart for seventeen years. He died in Stuttgart on 27 March 1589. His son-in-law Balduin Hoyoul succeeded him as Kapellmeister in Stuttgart.

== Influences, style, and impact ==
Daser's compositional output consisted mainly of masses, of which 22 manuscripts are extant. He also wrote motets. His works continued to be performed in a court context as late as 1616.

Daser was significantly influenced by the Franco-Flemish School, demonstrated by his methodology for tying the cantus firmus to the Ordinary. The sources of his melodies often originate from the Netherlands. He employed a variety of methods of treating plainchant melody within his masses, including canon, ornamentation, cantus firmus, and juxtaposition. Daser would move the cantus firmus from the tenor to the highest voicing, in order to highlight the main melody.

Daser was highly respected by his contemporaries, receiving high commendation from Bavarian court chronicler Massimo Troiano. Much of his work is held in manuscript form at the Bavarian State Library. His works are ambitious in nature, notable for their complexity. His contemporaries particularly valued his lyrical abilities. His style was conservative in nature for his time, evidenced by his four-voice masses and his reliance on the cantus firmus technique. However, his style became more "modern" during his time at Stuttgart.

Orlande de Lassus' mass number 40 Ecce nunc benedicite was directly modeled on a work by Daser.

== Works ==
=== Masses ===
==== 4 voices ====
- Ave Maria
- De virginibus
- Dominicalis (i)
- Dominicalis (ii)
- Ecce nunc benedicite
- Grace et vertu (attributed)
- Mins liefkins braun augen
- Paschalis
- Per signum crucis (attributed)
- Qui habitat
- Un gay bergier

==== 5 voices ====
- Beati omnes
- Dixerunt discipuli
- Ferialis
- Fors seulement
- Jerusalem surge
- In feriis quadragesimae
- Inviolata
- Maria Magdalena
- Pater noster
- Sexti modi

==== 6 voices ====
- Praeter rerum seriem

=== Mass Propers ===
- De Sancto Spiritu infra septuagesima (4 voices)
- De veneratione (4 voices)

In addition to the masses, he composed a work for four voices entitled Patrocinium musices; passionis Domini nostri Jesus Christi historia, a Magnificat for four voices, a Magnificat for eight voices, 24 motets for four to eight voices, and 34 hymns and psalms in German.
