= Gimel (game) =

Board game

Gimel is a board game published by Bütehorn Spiele in 1980.

== Gameplay ==
Gimel is an abstract strategy game. The board is composed of a grid of 18 x 8 squares. 48 wood pieces, 24 white and 24 black, of different shapes represent different animals of different point values and abilities. Placing these pieces on the board allows players to capture opposing pieces and earn points. On each player's turn they may either put a piece into play, or move an already placed piece.

== Reviews ==
- Games & Puzzles #78
- Jeux & Stratégie #2
