= Andrew Toovey =

British composer (born 1962)

- Born: 1962 (age 63–64)
- Education: University of Surrey; University of Sussex; University of London
- Occupations: Composer; Academic teacher
- Organizations: Birmingham City University

Andrew Toovey (born 1962) is a British composer of contemporary classical music. He has worked extensively on education projects for Glyndebourne Opera, English National Opera, Huddersfield Festival, the South Bank Centre and the London Festival Orchestra, and has been composer-in-residence at Opera Factory and the South Bank Summer School. He is now a full-time composer, but used to teach part-time at Bishop Ramsey School, Ruislip, Middlesex and Alperton Community School in Wembley. He currently teaches composition at the Royal Birmingham Conservatoire part of BCU.

== Education ==
Toovey studied composition with Jonathan Harvey, Michael Finnissy and briefly with Morton Feldman. After completing his BMus(hons) music degree at the University of Surrey he went on to take both an MA and MPhil at the University of Sussex, specialising in both composition and aesthetics. He also did a secondary school PGCE at the institute of Education at London University and a PhD at Birmingham City University.

== Career ==
Toovey was associate composer for the Young Concert Artists Trust (YCAT) from 1993 to 1995 and has been the artistic director of the new music ensemble IXION since 1987. Extensive archive website at www.ixionensemble.co.uk. He was composer-in-residence at the Banff Centre, Canada for four successive years with his Ubu opera and music theatre work The spurt of blood. He has worked extensively on education projects for Glyndebourne Opera, English National Opera, Huddersfield Festival, the South Bank Centre and the London Festival Orchestra, and has been composer-in-residence at Opera Factory and the South Bank Summer School.

Toovey's works have been performed throughout the UK, Europe, Canada, Japan, China, Australia, New Zealand and the USA. His works have also been featured at the Bergen, Brighton, Gaudeamus, Huddersfield and ISCM festivals and the Darmstadt and Dartington International Summer School. His music has been frequently broadcast on BBC Radio 3 and various European radio stations.

Commissions have included Music for the Painter Jack Smith (Brighton Festival), Dutch Dykes (De Ereprijs), Self-portrait as a Tiger! and Wenke (Ensemble Reconsil Wein), Going Home (Szymanowski String Quartet). He was commissioned by the BBC to write a viola concerto, premiered by Lawrence Power and the BBC Scottish Symphony Orchestra in Glasgow. He also composed a half-hour orchestral suite based on music from his first opera UBU also for the BBC conducted by IIan Volkov. Longer terms compositions include an opera Narrow Rooms based on a novel by James Purdy to a libretto by Michael Finnissy and a collection of poetry settings for voice/violin (or viola) as well as a range of compositions for chamber ensemble and solo instruments.

Other commissions have included Acrobats, for CoMA, mini opera I'll be there for you, commissioned by English Touring Opera, solo violin work Transparencies written for an exhibition of artist Julian Grater, and Noh for solo cello written for sculptor John Davies.

Two portrait CDs of his music were released on the Largo label in 1998, and many individual pieces are represented on others CD labels including NMC.

== Awards ==
Toovey is the recipient of composition awards including the Tippett Prize, Terra Nova Prize, the Bernard Shore Viola Composition Award and an RVW Trust Award.
