= Magnificat (Vaughan Williams) =

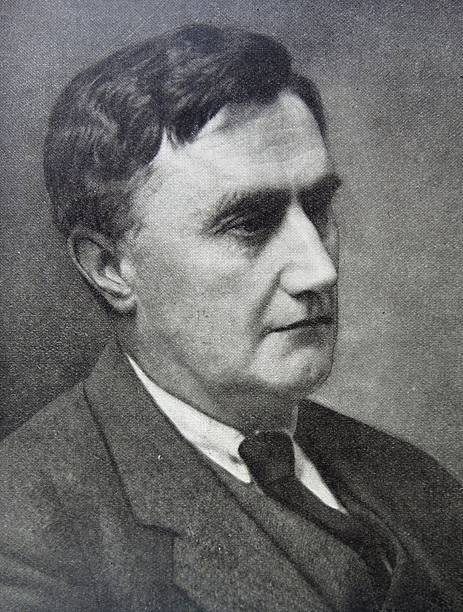
Portrait of Ralph Vaughan Williams by Herbert Lambert in the 1920s

Ralph Vaughan Williams composed his setting of the Magnificat or Song of Mary, one of the three New Testament canticles, in 1932. The magnificat is scored for contralto soloist, women's chorus, and an orchestra consisting of two flutes (the first player has a very prominent solo part; the second player doubles on piccolo), two oboes, cor anglais, two clarinets, two bassoons, four horns, two trumpets, timpani, triangle, cymbals, bass drum, tambourine, Indian drum, glockenspiel, celesta, harp, organ, and strings.
