= Balduin Hoyoul =

Belgian renaissance composer (1547/8–1594)

- Born: 1547 or 1548; Liège, Wallonia, Belgium
- Died: 26 November 1594 (aged 45–47); Stuttgart, Baden-Württemberg, Germany
- Occupation: Composer
- Years active: 1960–1594
- Era: Renaissance

Balduin Hoyoul (1547 or 1548 – 26 November 1594) was a Belgian Renaissance composer of the Franco-Flemish school.

Hoyoul was born in Liège. From the age of 13, he was a descant singer at the court in Stuttgart under Ludwig Daser. Between 1563 and 1564, he was a pupil of Orlando di Lasso in Munich. In 1589, Hoyoul took over from his father-in-law as Hofkapellmeister in Stuttgart. In 1593, he applied, unsuccessfully, for the more prestigious court post at Dresden. He died of the plague in Stuttgart in 1594 and was succeeded in Stuttgart by another pupil of Lasso, Leonhard Lechner.

== Works ==
- Sacrae cantiones, 5–10 voices, Nuremberg, 1587
- Geistliche Lieder und Psalmen, Nuremberg, 1589
- Missa "Anchor che col partire"
- Missa super "Rossignoles qui chantes au vert"
- 8 Magnificats
- 19 German hymns
- Latin motets

== Recordings ==
- Hoyoul: Sacræ Cantiones: Hofkapelle, dir. Michael Procter. Christophorus.
