= Richard Davy =

English composer, organist and choirmaster

Richard Davy (c. 1465–1538) was a Renaissance composer, organist and choirmaster, one of the most represented in the Eton Choirbook.

== Biography ==
Little is known about the life of Richard Davy. His name was a common one in Devon and he may have been born there. He was a scholar of Magdalen College, Oxford, and acted as choir master and organist at least in the period 1490-2. Churchwardens' accounts for Ashburton, Devon, mention a 'Dom. Richardus Dave:' from 1493-5, where he may have been acting as a chaplain or as master of the nearby school at St. Lawrence Chapel. He may then have moved to Exeter Cathedral to be vicar choral in the period 1497-1506.

== Work and influence ==
Davy is the third most represented composer in the Eton choirbook, with ten compositions including the votive antiphon O Domine celi terreque creator, which according to an inscription in Eton was composed in a single day. His work is considered more florid than that of his contemporaries Robert Fayrfax and William Cornish and may have had considerable impact on later figures such as John Taverner.
