= Thomas Preston (composer) =

English organist and composer (died c. 1563)

Thomas Preston (died c. 1563) was an English organist and composer who held posts at Magdalen College, Oxford, Trinity College, Cambridge, and St George's Chapel at Windsor Castle.

According to John Caldwell, his music features fine 4-part counterpoint, intricacies of rhythm, and a virtuosic approach to the keyboard, even though all the surviving music is liturgical.

== Known works ==
12 Offertory settings for keyboard, including Felix namque, and Mass versets for Easter, containing the only known sequence setting of the time (only part of the sequence survives.)

The anonymous ground for keyboard Uppon la mi re (MB, LXVI, 1995) in the collection Add.29996 (London British Library) is often attributed to him.
