= Richard Hygons =

English composer

Richard Hygons (also Higons, Huchons, Hugo; c. 1435 – c. 1509) was an English composer of the early Renaissance and early proponent of the English votive style. While only two compositions of this late 15th-century composer have survived, one of them, a five-voice setting of the Salve Regina Marian antiphon, has attracted interest from musicologists because of its close relationship to music being written at the same time on the continent, as well as its high level of workmanship.

== Life ==
Hygons seems to have spent his entire career at Wells Cathedral; at any rate, no records survive indicating his activities elsewhere. He is first mentioned in 1458 as a vicar-choral, and in 1460 he was ordained as an acolyte. Between 1461 and 1462 he was one of the five organists that the cathedral employed. A document dated 7 December 1479 gives more detail than any other about his duties: he was given a house to use, rent-free, near to the cathedral; he was given an annual salary of a little over 96 shillings; he was to teach all aspects of music to the choristers, and was expected to teach organ to anyone who had the talent. His required presence at certain masses, Vespers, and Matins was also given in detail.

In 1487 he received a substantial raise in annual salary, and became the principal organist of the cathedral. By 1507 his health was in decline, and he appointed a deputy (Richard Bramston) to help him carry out some of his duties. He was still alive in May 1508, when he hired another assistant, and he died at Wells, probably in 1509.

== Music and influence ==
Only two compositions of Hygons are known to survive: a two-voice setting of the Gaude virgo mater Christi, which appears on a single surviving leaf of a choirbook from Wells Cathedral (the enormous majority of music from the 15th century and early 16th century was destroyed in the Dissolution of the Monasteries by Henry VIII), and the famous Salve Regina from the Eton Choirbook.

The Salve Regina is unique among English music of the period in that its cantus firmus, drawn from the melisma on the word "caput" in the Sarum antiphon Venit ad Petrum, is the same as that from three earlier Caput masses by composers from elsewhere: Jacob Obrecht, Johannes Ockeghem, and an anonymous composer once thought to be Guillaume Dufay. Recent research has suggested that this third mass was actually by an unknown Englishman working in the early 15th century, and is the original for the later three works. The Salve Regina, being based on a votive antiphon for Maundy Thursday, was probably intended for use on that day.

The difficulty, complexity, and craftsmanship shown in Hygons's Salve Regina has suggested that the musical standards at Wells Cathedral at the end of the 15th century were high, and matched those of musical centres across the Channel.

== References and further reading ==
- Nicholas Sandon: "Richard Hygons", Grove Music Online, ed. L. Macy (Accessed April 16, 2006), (subscription access)
- Gustave Reese, Music in the Renaissance. New York, W.W. Norton & Co., 1954. ISBN 0-393-09530-4
