= Thomas Ashwell =

English composer

Thomas Ashwell or Ashewell (c. 1478 – after 1513 (possibly 1527?)) was an English composer of the Renaissance. He was a skilled composer of polyphony, and may have been the teacher of John Taverner.

His admission to St. George's Chapel as a chorister in 1491 suggests a birthdate of approximately 1478, but nothing else is known about his early life. He stayed at St. George's until 1493, and account records at Tattershall College in Lincolnshire list him as a singer there in 1502 and 1503. He was in a position of authority at Lincoln Cathedral in 1508, according to records there, and was employed at Durham Cathedral as Cantor or Master of the singing boys, and to provide music for the Lady Chapel, in 1513; no further records survive of his life. The Durham Cathedral archives show the first successor to his duties there as being a William Robson, who began his duties in 1527, and this may be an indication of Ashwell's death some time before that.

== Surviving Ashwell compositions ==
Only scattered remnants of Ashwell's music survive. As was common for pre-Reformation music in England in Latin, the large majority of manuscripts were destroyed during the Dissolution of the Monasteries by Henry VIII (and a large proportion of English-language sacred music was destroyed during the subsequent reign of Mary, during her attempt to re-impose Roman Catholicism on the island). Two masses, both for six voices, survive complete in the Forrest-Heyther Partbooks, the first layer of which were copied for Taverner's use at Cardinal College in 1526–1530. With the fall of Cardinal Wolsey in 1529 the college founded by him was not able to devote resources to such music and so the manuscript was discontinued, and this situation was probably the reason for Taverner's departure that year. This first layer contains the Missa Jesu Christe (for 6 voices) and ten other works by various composers, including Taverner. The other Mass-setting (Missa Ave Maria, also for 6 voices, which is the finer of the two and an outstanding work with similarities to Taverner's Missa Gloria tibi Trinitas) was copied into the partbooks mid-century along with five other settings by other composers, though the dates of composition of both Ashwell Masses were considerably earlier: their style indicates dates of composition possibly even before his appointment at Durham. A few other works survive in other sources, mostly very fragmentary, including a fragment of a Mass for St. Cuthbert, which must date from his time at Durham. A song, "She may be callyd a sovrant lady", printed in a 1530 collection, is Ashwell's only surviving secular composition.

== Connection to Taverner ==
The connection with John Taverner as his possible teacher is tenuous but suggestive. The unsubstantiated suggestion has long existed that Taverner was a chorister at Tattershall, and should this have been the case he would have been there at the same time as Ashwell. Taverner seems to have at least been very familiar with the two Ashwell Masses, as he appears to have used them as models for his own (if the apparent dating is not incorrect, and Ashwell based his on Taverner's). A personal connection with Ashwell would account for the inclusion of his Masses in the Forrest-Heyther Partbooks, copied either by Taverner or for him when he became head of music at Cardinal College, Oxford in 1526. The first layer of the Forrest-Heyther Partbooks is headed by Taverner's own Mass Gloria tibi Trinitas (which seems to have much in common with Ashwell's Missa Ave Maria) in six voices, and the only other six-part Mass in this layer is Ashwell's Jesu Christe, all the other works in this first layer being for only five voices (however, the piece immediately following Gloria tibi Trinitas is the hexachord Mass by Avery/Davy Burton: but although there are only five parts in the partbooks, it seems that a sixth part was unintentionally omitted). These partbooks contain generally rather newer music than that of Ashwell, and his inclusion would be typical of a student-teacher relationship.

However, it may equally go some way to explaining Ashwell's presence in the Forrest-Heyther Partbooks to recall that the partbooks were compiled for Cardinal Wolsey's new college, and that Wolsey was also Bishop of Durham earlier in his career, and many of the composers had connections to institutions which had connections to Wolsey. It could be that the partbooks were also meant to act as a kind of survey in homage of the most important composers from many of Wolsey's dioceses.

Ashwell's reputation survived at least until the end of the 16th century, since Thomas Morley listed him as an authority in his 1597 treatise A Plaine and Easie Introduction to Practicall Musicke.
