= Caius Choirbook =

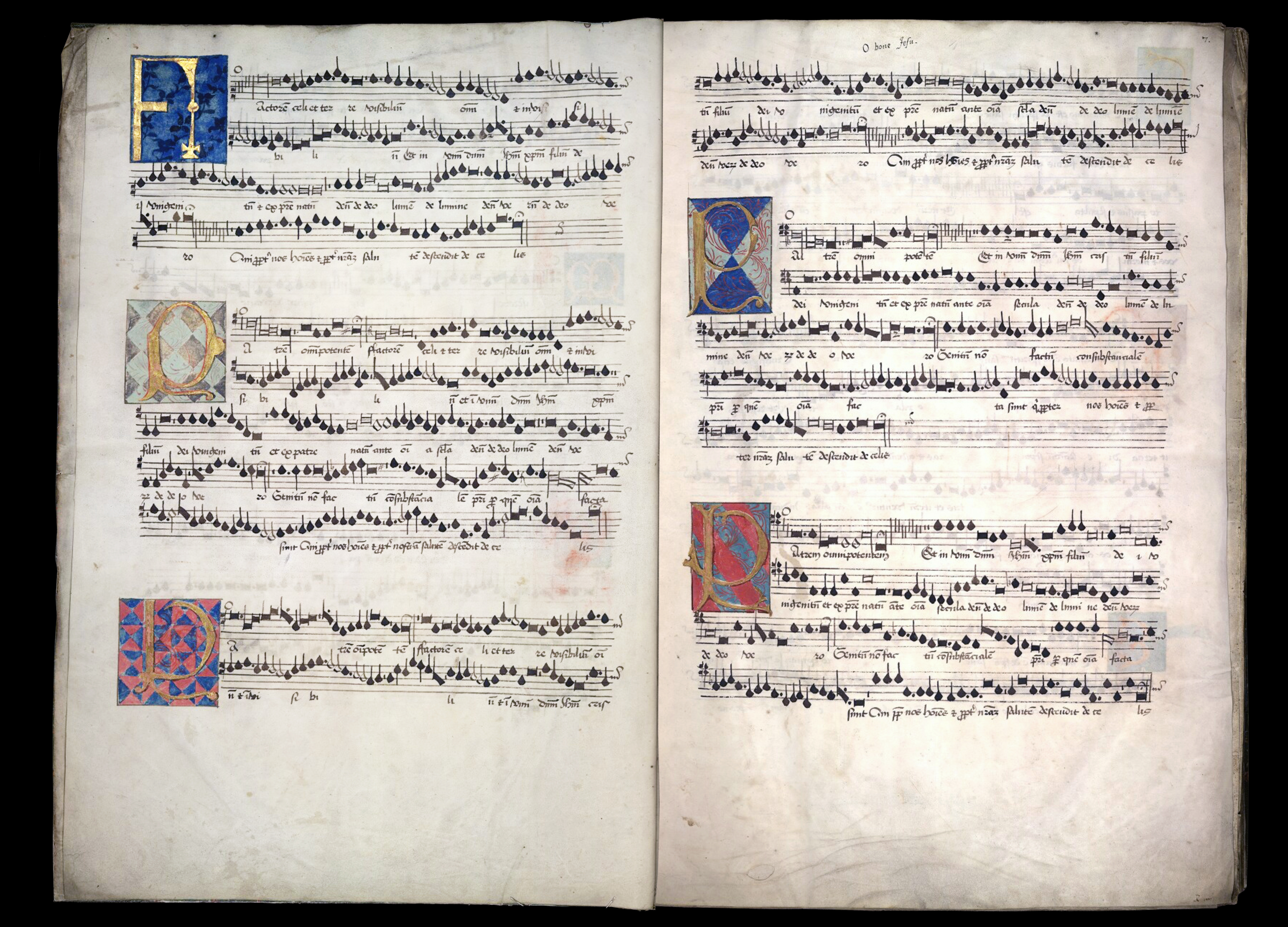
Caius Choirbook excerpt containing part of Missa O Bone Jesu - Credo by Robert Fayrfax

The Caius Choirbook is an illuminated choirbook dating to the early sixteenth century and containing music of the English votive movement. The book appears to originate from Arundel in Sussex, and to have been created sometime in the late 1520s; the then Master of Arundel College, Edward Higgons, seems to have presented it to the collegiate chapel of Saint Stephen's in Westminster, where he was a canon beginning in 1518. The choirbook is now housed at Gonville and Caius College, Cambridge.

The major contributors to the Caius Choirbook are Robert Fayrfax and Nicholas Ludford; between them they contributed at least eleven of its fifteen pieces. Music by older composers, such as Edmund Stourton and Walter Lambe, may be found in the Lambeth and Eton Choirbooks, but not in the Caius Choirbook. Other composers represented in the Caius Choirbook include William Cornysh, Edmund Turges, and Henry Prentes. There is in addition a Mass by William Pasche, based upon Christus resurgens, a processional antiphon for Easter.
