= English Votive Style =

English movement of Renaissance choral polyphony (15th Century)

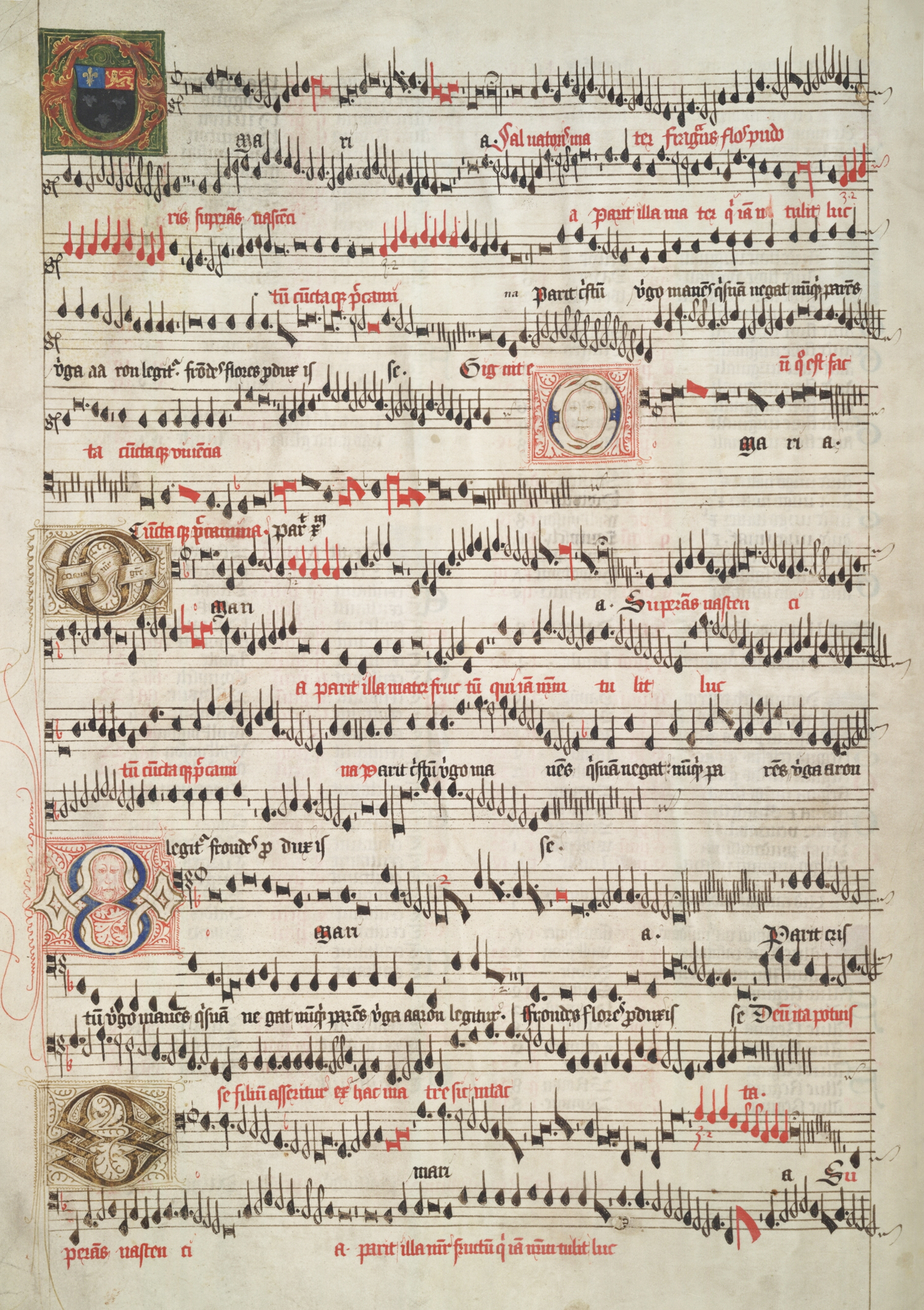
O Maria salvatoris, from the Eton Choirbook

The English Votive Style, or simply the Votive Style, (Note: The phrase is often used interchangeably with antiphon style i.e. "florid antiphon style" (Williamson) or "cult of the antiphon" (Bowers). Benham, Carwood and Skinner use the term "votive".) was a movement in English early Renaissance choral polyphony that began in the 1470s, in the final stages of the Wars of the Roses, and ended in the 1540s, with the death of Henry VIII and the beginning of the Edwardian Reformation. A brief revival occurred in the 1550s with the reign of Mary I, which came to an end by the 1559 injunctions.

The style is characterised by high treble lines, long solo verses and a frequent use of melisma throughout. Votive antiphons in the style were generally performed at the end of the day, after compline, while longer Lady Masses occurred on feast days. While most of the surviving body in the style is Marian, masses and motets for other non-Marian feast days were also composed.

== History ==
=== Origins ===
The contenance angloise, that began with proponents such as Dunstaple and Power, had a far-reaching influence across Europe. It also inspired the fervent Marian devotion of England to become more musical, beginning with the Old Hall Manuscript. Henry VI, kind, pious but possibly suffering from delusions of grandeur, began the construction of Eton College Chapel and Kings College Chapel, both of which have long decani and cantoris bays for large-scale antiphonal singing. The 1443 King's College statutes state that an impressive 6 singing-chaplains, 4 clerks and 10 choristers made up its choir for that year, even though the chapel was not yet complete. The singers at King's College and Eton became increasingly skilled over the decades as the chapels were built. Henry VI also invested greatly into the music of the Chapel Royal, which also increased to twenty clerks and seven choristers by 1455. That same year, the lay clerks of the Chapel petitioned the king in increasing the number of adult lay clerks from 20 to 24, due to "the grete labour that thei have daily in your chapell". It was in this intense environment, and in major cathedrals such as Wells and Lincoln, that the careers of the earliest proponents of the English votive style began.

=== 1470s–1510: Growth ===
The Eton Choirbook represents the three phases of development of the votive style. The first phase, from around the 1470s when Richard Hygons began to flourish, is non-imitative, with contrast being achieved by alternating sections of voices. Hygons' Salve regina is based on the caput cantus firmus, which suggests that the early mass Missa caput that inspired continental composer was written by an Englishman. William Horwood and Gilbert Banester also gained prominence in the 1470s and are part of the same phase. Edward IV, a profligate, continued Henry VI's large investments into choral music by appointing Banester as a "king's servant" and later the Master of the Choristers of the Chapel Royal in 1471 and 1478. Edward also provided Banester corrodies for two abbeys.

The second phase has an increased use of imitation, cantus firmus techniques and frequent cross-relations, the latter of which would become a hallmark of Tudor music. John Browne, a composer who was appointed as a scholar of Eton at the age of 14, produced a Stabat mater with a high degree of word painting: "Crucifige! Crucifige!" is written in a way to mimic cries from a crowd. Browne's O Maria salvatoris has 8 voice parts (which was ahead for its time) was regarded highly enough to be the first antiphon of the Eton Choirbook, and Stabat iuxta has unusual TTBB (Note: Tenor-Tenor, Bass-Bass scoring.) scoring with dense cluster chords. Richard Davy's music shares characteristics of the second phase with Browne's oeuvre, including a certain lack of Landini sixths that were more common during the early half of the 15th century during the contenance angloise. Davy's O Domine caeli terraesque contains many cross-relations for dramatic effect. Walter Lambe, another scholar of Eton, contributed music of the second phase to St George's Chapel in the 1480s and 1490s and his works are well represented in the Eton choirbook and Caius choirbook.

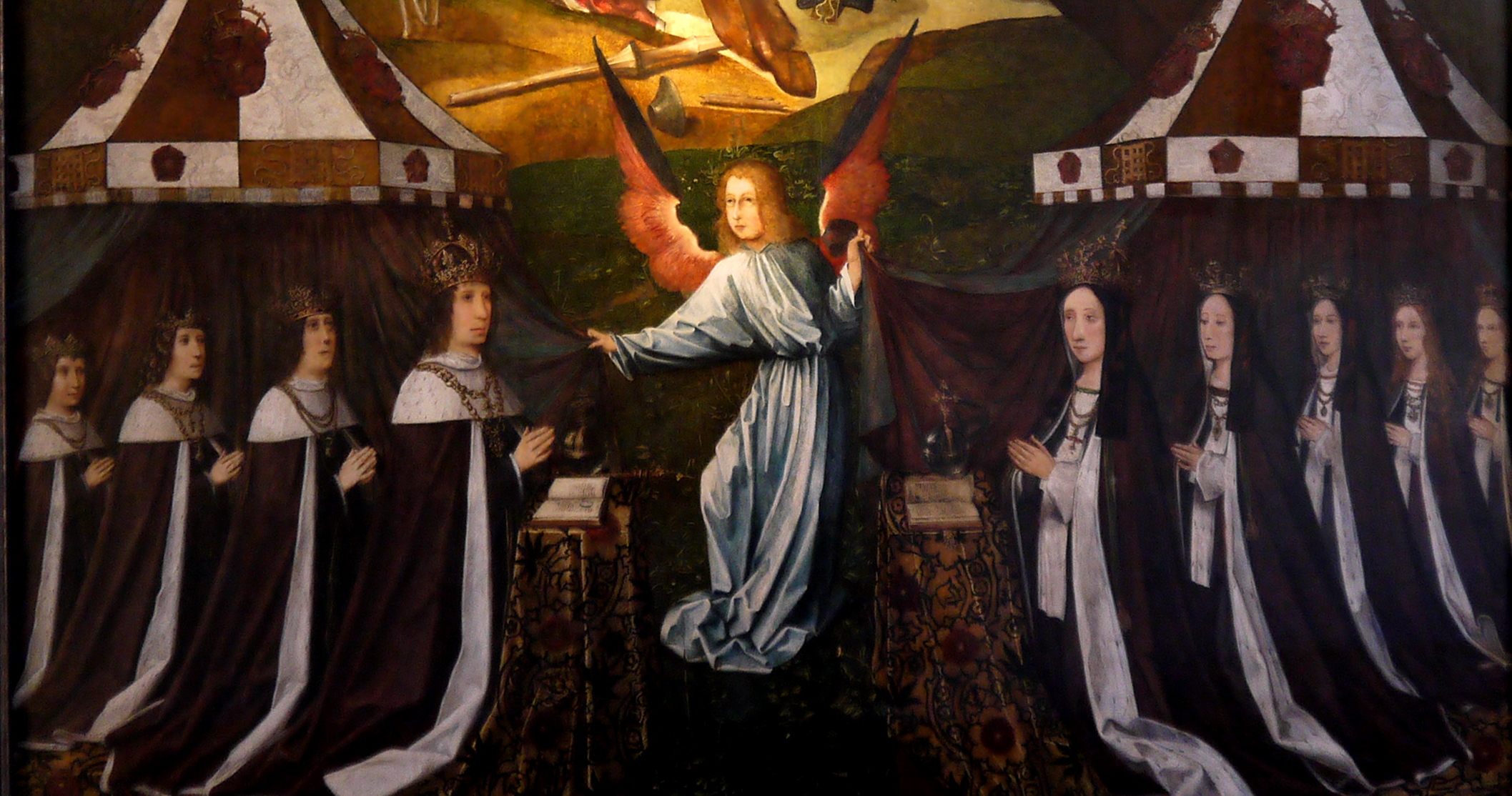
Henry VII, Elizabeth of York and their children

The final phase has frequent imitation throughout the texture, an increased range and more elaborate phrasing of the voice parts, and a decreased or loose use of cantus firmus techniques. Banester's O Maria et Elizabeth, the only contribution of his to the Eton choirbook, is more florid than his other works and employs a lengthy text concerning the motherhood of Mary and Elizabeth, but ends with a prayer for the king. The addition "Bendicam te Domine", the third antiphon for Lauds on the Sunday of the wedding of Henry VII and Elizabeth of York for the work's cantus firmus, means that it was likely composed to commemorate their marriage in 1486. Elizabeth of York, seemingly a patron of the votive style, commissioned antiphons and masses in devotion to Mary and St. Elizabeth from Robert Fayrfax, paying him twenty shillings for one antiphon in 1502. Margaret Beaufort, mother to the king, commissioned the first English parody mass from Fayrfax based on his earlier motet, O bone Jesu. William Cornysh, appointed as Master of the Choristers at the Chapel Royal in 1509, composed a Magnificat of rapid, ornamented melodic lines.

=== 1510–1530: Peak ===
The Caius choirbook, Lambeth choirbook and the Peterhouse partbooks represent the votive style during the reign of Henry VIII. Nicholas Ludford was highly prolific, producing 17 masses in total (more than any other English composer at the time) including a rare and unique survival of seven masses that make up a lady mass cycle; the cycle can be found in a manuscript collection that belonged to Henry and his first wife, Catherine of Aragon. Ludford's music is notable for the abundance of melody and for the imaginative use of vocal texture, and contains florid detail throughout.

John Taverner was another prolific composer, composing for Cardinal Wolsey at Christ Church, Oxford in his position as Master of the Choristers (Informator Choristarum) there. Christe Jesu, pastor bone is an antiphon that he wrote for either Wolsey or Henry around 1526 that employs frequent points of imitation and cross-relations. Taverner's O splendor gloriae uses long lines of melisma to highlight climaxes throughout the antiphon and an apparent dissonance at "mater pietatis" is for expressing longing, or tension.

In the Chapel Royal, the estimates for the amount of money spent a year on its music during the 1520s is around £1,500, or £1,418,000 in today's money as of June 2025. Starkey notes that by the 1530s, the budget was £1,200, rising to upwards of £2000 (2025: >£1,500,000) for special feasts. This is a vast sum compared to the Chapel's spending of £300 (2025: £290,000) per annum in the 1490s. Much of this was spent on the salaries of the lay clerks, which was some £5-10 in the 1520s, to £20 in 1531. An additional £400 was spent on the repair of organs alone, which were becoming more involved in providing alternatim verses for worship from the 1520s onward. Felix namque es was a popular Marian chant for organists to use as a cantus firmus for improvisation and compositions, with Taverner, Preston, Tallis and various other anonymous organists producing their own settings.

=== 1530–1547: Decline ===
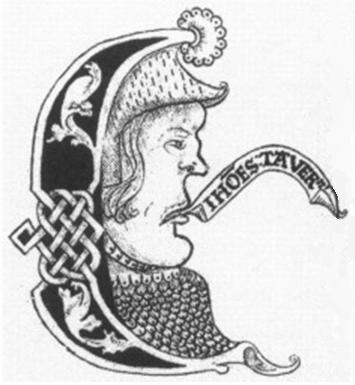
John Taverner (Image from the Forrest-Heyther Partbooks) purportedly denounced his compositions as "popish ditties" after becoming protestant. (Note: Benham notes that John Foxe's account, apart from being highly dubious, does not name Taverner. Rather the quote is attributed to an unnamed, major composer at the time of the Henrician reformation.)

Into the early 1530s, the melismatic voice-lines began to be supplanted with more succinct phrasing from continental traditions. For example, Tallis' Missa salve intemerata (a parody mass) is more homophonic than the earlier antiphon, Salve intemerata, from which the mass is derived. Taverner's later works also show more homophony, although the change may also be due to Taverner's new religious beliefs. Indeed, the English Reformation was the main driving force for the end of the Votive Style, with the dissolution of the monasteries leading to the sanctioned seizure and burning of musical manuscripts. The closure of chantries also reduced the volume of choral music in England and especially reduced the number of Marian antiphons sung. The 1538 injunctions denounced "superstitious" i.e. Marian musical practices, "feigned images", and also discouraged polyphony having a widely-enforced effect on music across the country.

Although the first English-texted litanies were being composed for the protestant Church of England in the 1540s, Henry VIII still celebrated the Sarum Catholic mass in his own chapel, in spite of all the liturgical reforms at the time. There is a curious case of an antiphon, Tallis' Gaude gloriosa Dei mater, being recommissioned as a contrafactum Se Lord and behold with the text of an English psalm translation by Catherine Parr. The intention was for Se Lord and behold to be used in Henry's French campaign and the capture of Boulogne in 1544. When Edward VI reigned from 1547, the lone use of Sarum in the royal chapel came to an end.

=== 1553–1559: Revival and end ===
Mary I became queen in 1553 and sought the restoration of Latin services immediately, with Mundy's Vox Patris caelestis being a new antiphon in the old votive style being sung at her proclamation and coronation pageantries. The solo sections of Vox Patris caelestis are enlarged in scope, climaxing at a gimel where two equal treble voices sing above a dense texture of altos and basses with considerable range. New composers that began their careers during the decline of the votive style enthusiastically contributed to the revival; John Sheppard produced the grand six-part antiphon Gaude, gaude, gaude, Maria; Robert White produced his setting of the Magnificat, which contains his distinctive major-minor shifts. With Mary's marriage to Philip, a new artistic exchange occurred between the Spanish Low Countries and England. Tallis' Missa Puer natus est nobis was composed for the joint Chapel Royal and Capilla Flamenca choirs, which sang together in Christmas 1554. Missa Puer natus exhibits stylistic characteristics of both the Franco-Flemish and English Votive traditions, likely due to the contact between the two choirs.

The movement came to a final end in 1559, when Elizabeth's injunctions limited the text of church music to be in English, except for special occasions, and to concern only biblical subjects. This allowed for the composition of shorter motets and anthems (usually more modern, highly imitative with Italian influences) while antiphons and masses were explicitly prohibited. Italian influence from the 1560s onwards, partly due to the presence of Ferrabosco in England, gave way to the madrigal school and new, effective-imitative contrapuntal techniques to be used by older composers such as Tallis and Tallis' student, William Byrd.

== Legacy ==
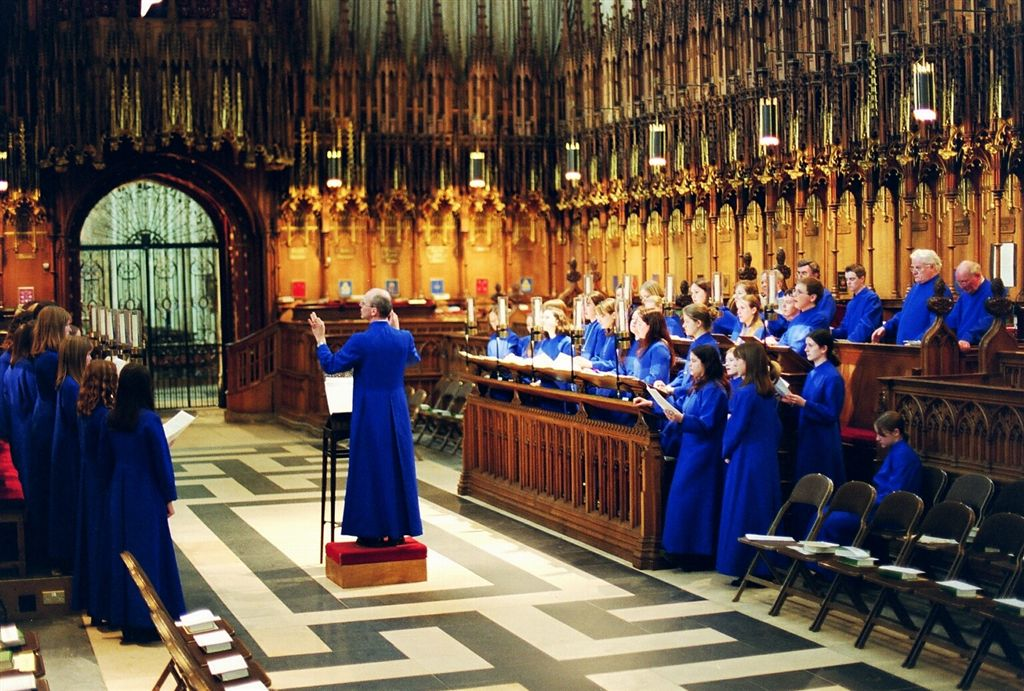
A choir singing choral evensong in York Minster

Although composition in the votive style ceased, Marian antiphons continued to be copied, studied and presumably performed into the 1570s. Morley gives special deference to Fayrfax as an authoritative figure in English music and names him and Taverner as some of the finest composers of their day and equals to Lassus. Some composers, such as Tallis, edited earlier works in the Votive Style to align them with more modern styles of late renaissance polyphony. Although employed in pieces belonging to the style of the Virginalist School, Felix namque es was used as a keyboard subject for many decades, with Thomas Tomkins' 1654 settings being the last examples to be composed. Viol and organ settings of In Nomine were written until the end of the 17th century.

The Oxford movement in the 1830s promoted Marian antiphons in England in a push for Latin worship in the Church of England. Votive antiphons are performed often at Sarum revival events. Many commercial recordings of the Eton Choirbook and Caius Choirbook exist from groups such as the Tallis Scholars. In churches of the Anglican Communion, choristers and lay clerks often face each other antiphonally, placed in the quire's Decani and Cantoris, just as they did to sing votive antiphons in the late Plantagenet and early Tudor periods.

== See also ==
- English madrigal
