= Hugh Kellyk =

English composer

Hugh Kellyk (fl.c.1480) was an English composer, whose two surviving works are preserved in the Eton Choirbook. These two works are a five-part Magnificat and a seven-part Gaude flore virginali, which appear to be among the earlier pieces in the choirbook. Gaude Flore Virginali was recorded by The Sixteen in 1993, the Magnificat by Tonus Peregrinus.
