= Eton Choirbook =

Manuscript of English sacred music (15th Century)

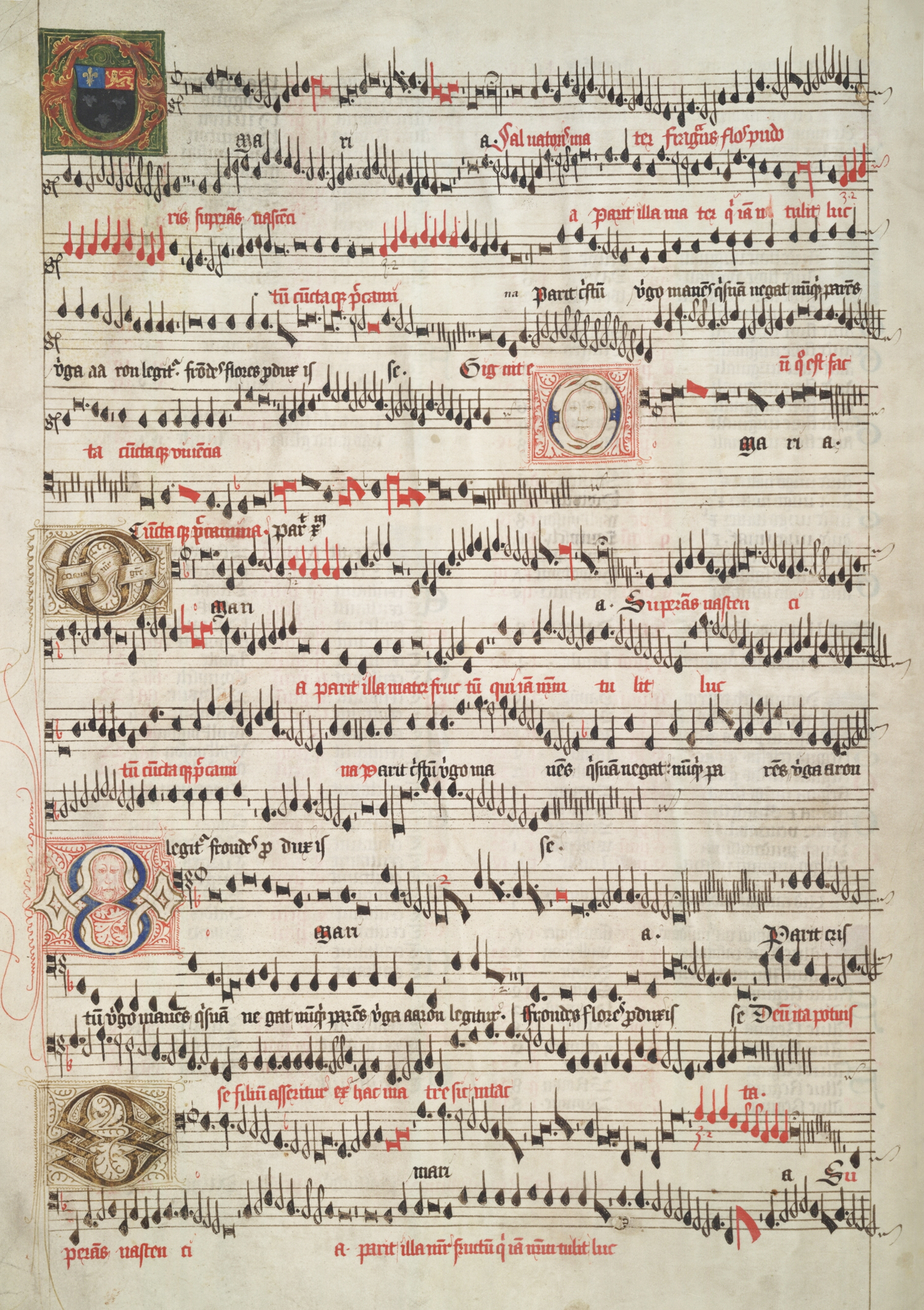
O Maria salvatoris, from the Eton Choirbook

The Eton Choirbook (Eton College MS. 178) is a richly illuminated manuscript collection of English sacred music composed during the late 15th century. It was one of very few collections of Latin liturgical music to survive the English Reformation, and hence is an important source for the English votive style. It originally contained music by 24 different composers; however, many of the pieces are damaged or incomplete. It is one of three large choirbooks surviving from early-Tudor England (the others are the Lambeth Choirbook and the Caius Choirbook).

The Choirbook was compiled between approximately 1500 and 1505 for use at Eton College; its present binding dates from the mid 16th century. 126 folios remain of the original 224, including the index. In the original, there were a total of 93 separate compositions; however only 64 remain either complete or in part. Some of the 24 composers are known only because of their inclusion in the Eton Choirbook. John Browne has the most compositions (15), followed by Walter Lambe (12) and Richard Davy (10).

Stylistically, the music contained in the Eton Choirbook shows three phases in the development of the English votive style. The first phase is represented by the music of Richard Hygons, William Horwood and Gilbert Banester. Most of the music of this early phase is polyphonic but non-imitative, with contrast achieved by alternation of full five-voice texture with sections sung by fewer voices. The second phase, which includes music by John Browne, Richard Davy and Walter Lambe, uses imitation, cantus firmus techniques, and frequent cross-relations (a feature which was to become a distinctive sound in early Tudor polyphony). The final phase represented in the choirbook includes music by William Cornysh and Robert Fayrfax, composed around 1500. Points of imitation are frequent and cantus firmus techniques disappear. Melisma features prominently in practically all works in the choirbook.

== Contents ==
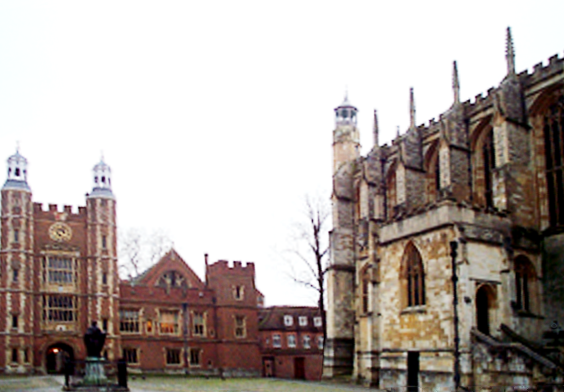
Eton College.

All of the compositions in the book are sacred vocal music in Latin. According to the index, it initially contained 93 works. However, part of its content was lost and only 64 works have survived, a few of them incomplete. They consist of:

- 54 motets
- 9 Magnificats
- 1 Passion

The following inventory represents the contents as enumerated by the index, with folio numbers for the works that survive.

1. f. 1v-4: O Maria salvatoris mater - John Browne (i)
2. f. 4v-8: Gaude flore virginali - Hugh Kellyk
3. f. 8v-9v: O Maria plena gratiae - Walter Lambe
4. f. 10-11: Gaude flore virginali - Richard Davy
5. f. 11v-14: Stabat mater dolorosa - ?John Browne (ii)
6. f. 14v: O regina caelestis gloriae - Walter Lambe
7. f. 15-17: Stabat virgo mater Christi - ?John Browne (i)
8. f. 17v-19: Stabat juxta Christi crucem - ?John Browne (i)
9. f. 19v-22: O regina mundi clara - ?John Browne (i)
10. f. 22v-25: Gaude virgo mater Christi - Sturton
11. f. 25v: O virgo prudentissima - Robert Wilkinson [incomplete]
12. missing: Gaude flore virginali - Robert Wilkinson
13. missing: Salve regina vas mundiciae - Fawkner
14. f. 26: Gaude flore virginali - William Cornysh (senior) [incomplete]
15. f. 26v-29: Salve regina mater misericordiae - Robert Wilkinson
16. f. 29v-30: Salve regina mater misericordiae - William Brygeman
17. f. 30v-32: Salve regina mater misericordiae - William Horwood
18. f. 32v-34: Salve regina mater misericordiae - Richard Davy
19. f. 34v-36: Salve regina mater misericordiae - ?William Cornysh (senior)
20. f. 36v-38: Salve regina mater misericordiae - ?John Browne (ii)
21. f. 038v-40: Salve regina mater misericordiae - Walter Lambe
22. f. 40v-042: Salve regina mater misericordiae - John Sutton
23. f. 42v-44: Salve regina mater misericordiae - Robert Hacomplaynt
24. f. 44v-46: Salve regina mater misericordiae - Nicholas Huchyn
25. f. 46v-48: Salve regina mater misericordiae - Robert Wilkinson
26. f. 48v-50: Salve regina mater misericordiae - Robert Fayrfax
27. f. 50v-52: Salve regina mater misericordiae - Richard Hygons
28. f. 52v-54: Salve regina mater misericordiae - ?John Browne (i)
29. f. 54v-56: Salve regina mater misericordiae - John Hampton
30. f. 56v-59: O Domine caeli terraeque creator - Richard Davy
31. f. 59v-62: Salve Jesu mater vera - Richard Davy
32. f. 62v-65: Stabat mater dolorosa - Richard Davy
33. f. 65v-68: Virgo templum trinitatis - Richard Davy
34. f. 68v-71: In honore summae matris - Richard Davy
35. f. 71v-74: O Maria et Elisabeth - Gilbert Banester
36. f. 74v-76: Gaude flore virginali - William Horwood
37. f. 76v-77v: Gaude virgo mater Christi - William Horwood
38. missing: O regina caelestis gloriae - Walter Lambe
39. missing: Gaude flore virginali - Walter Lambe
40. missing: Virgo gaude gloriosa - Walter Lambe
41. missing: Stabat mater dolorosa - Robert Fayrfax
42. missing: Ave cuius conceptio - Robert Fayrfax
43. missing: Quid cantemus innocentes - Robert Fayrfax
44. missing: Gaude flore virginali - John Dunstaple
45. missing: Ave lux totius mundi - ?John Browne (i)
46. missing: Gaude flore virginali - ?John Browne (i)
47. missing: Stabat mater dolorosa - ?William Cornysh (senior)
48. f. 78-80: Stabat mater dolorosa - ?William Cornysh (senior)
49. f. 80v-82: Gaude virgo salutata - Fawkner
50. f. 82v-85: Gaude rosa sine spina - Fawkner
51. f. 85v-87: Gaude flore virginali - Edmund Turges
52. f. 87v-88: Nesciens mater virgo virum - Walter Lambe
53. f. 88v: Salve decus castitatis - Robert Wilkinson
54. f. 89: Ascendit Christus hodie - Nicholas Huchyn
55. f. 89v-91v: O mater venerabilis - ?John Browne (i)
56. missing: Ad te purissima virgo - ?William Cornysh (senior)
57. f. 92v-93v: Ave lumen gratiae - Robert Fayrfax
58. missing: O virgo virginum praeclara - Walter Lambe
59. f. 94-95: Gaude virgo mater Christi - Robert Wilkinson
60. f. 95v-97: Stabat virgo mater Christi - ?John Browne (i)
61. f. 97v-99: Stella caeli extirpavit que lactavit - Walter Lambe
62. f. 99v-101: Ascendit Christus hodie - Walter Lambe
63. f. 101v-103: Gaude flore virginali - Walter Lambe
64. f. 103v-105: Gaude flore virginali - Edmund Turges
65. f. 105v-106: Ave Maria mater Dei - ?William Cornysh (senior)
66. f. 106v-108: Gaude virgo mater Christi - ?William Cornysh (senior)
67. f. 108v-110v: Gaude virgo salutata - Holynborne
68. missing: Magnificat: Et exultavit spiritus meus - John Browne (i)
69. missing: Magnificat: Et exultavit spiritus meus - Richard Davy
70. f. 111: Magnificat: Et exultavit spiritus meus - John Nesbet
71. f. 111v-113: Magnificat: Et exultavit spiritus meus - William Horwood
72. f. 113v-116: Magnificat: Et exultavit spiritus meus - Hugh Kellyk
73. f. 116v-118: Magnificat: Et exultavit spiritus meus - Walter Lambe
74. f. 118v: Magnificat: Et exultavit spiritus meus - John Browne (i)
75. missing: Magnificat: Et exultavit spiritus meus - Robert Fayrfax
76. missing: Magnificat: Et exultavit spiritus meus - William Brygeman
77. missing: Magnificat: Et exultavit spiritus meus - Robert Wilkinson
78. missing: Magnificat: Et exultavit spiritus meus - Robert Mychelson
79. f. 119-119v: Magnificat: Et exultavit spiritus meus - Robert Wilkinson
80. missing: Magnificat: Et exultavit spiritus meus - William Cornysh (Junior)
81. missing: Magnificat: Et exultavit spiritus meus - John Browne (i)
82. f. 120-120v: Magnificat: Et exultavit spiritus meus - John Sygar
83. missing: Magnificat: Et exultavit spiritus meus - John Browne (i)
84. missing: Magnificat: Et exultavit spiritus meus - Edmund Turges
85. missing: Magnificat: Et exultavit spiritus meus - Edmund Turges
86. missing: Magnificat: Et exultavit spiritus meus - John Baldwin
87. missing: Magnificat: Et exultavit spiritus meus - John Sygar
88. missing: Magnificat: Et exultavit spiritus meus - John Baldwin
89. missing: Magnificat: Et exultavit spiritus meus - Edmund Turges
90. f. 121: Magnificat: Et exultavit spiritus meus - Richard Davy
91. f. 121v-123: Magnificat: Et exultavit spiritus meus - William Stratford
92. f. 124-126: Passio Domini - Richard Davy
93. f. 126v: Jesus autem transiens - Robert Wilkinson

The composers represented in the manuscript are: John Browne (15 works), Walter Lambe (12), Richard Davy (10), Robert Wilkinson (7), William Cornysh (5), William Horwood (4), Robert Fayrfax (6), John Fawkyner (2), Nicholas Huchyn (2), Hugh Kellyk (2), Edmund Turges (2), Gilbert Banester, William Brygeman (1), Robert Hacomplaynt (1), John Hampton (1), Holynborne (1), Richard Hygons (1), Nesbet (1), Edmund Sturton (1), John Sutton (1), John Sygar (1) and William Stratford (1).

Other composers as Baldwyn, John Dunstable and Mychelson also appear in the index, but their works were lost.

== Sources ==
- Harold Gleason and Warren Becker, Music in the Middle Ages and Renaissance (Music Literature Outlines Series I). Bloomington, Indiana. Frangipani Press, 1986. ISBN 0-89917-034-X
- "Sources, MS, Renaissance Polyphony", from Grove Music Online ed. L. Macy (Accessed April 24, 2005), (subscription access)
- Gustave Reese, Music in the Renaissance. New York, W.W. Norton & Co., 1954. ISBN 0-393-09530-4

== Recordings ==
Harry Christophers, The Sixteen: Eton Choirbook Volumes I-V

- The Rose and The Ostrich Feather, CORO: CD COR16026.
- The Crown of Thorns, CORO: CD COR16012.
- The Pillars Of Eternity, CORO: CD COR16022.
- The Flower of All Virginity, CORO: CD COR16018.
- Voices of Angels, CORO: CD COR16002.

Stephen Darlington, Choir of Christ Church Cathedral Oxford: Music from The Eton Choir Book, volumes 1–5

- More Divine Than Human, Avie: AV2167.
- Choirs of Angels, Avie: AV2184.
- Courts of Heaven, Avie: AV2314
- The Sun Most Radiant, Avie: AV2359
- The Gate of Glory, Avie: AV2376

Other groups:

- Music from the Eton Choirbook, Tonus Peregrinus, Antony Pitts, Dir. Naxos 8.572840
- Richard Davy: Passion According To St. Matthew. (Eton Choirbook, Record 1). Purcell Consort of Voices, Choristers of All Saints, Margaret Street, Dir. Grayston Burgess. Vinyl LP, Argo ZRG 558.
- Eton Choirbook, Record 2. Purcell Consort of Voices, Choristers of All Saints, Margaret Street, Dir. Grayston Burgess. Vinyl LP, Argo ZRG 557.
- The Eton Choirbook Huelgas Ensemble, Dir. Paul Van Nevel. 2012 DHM: CD 88765408852.
- William Cornysh: Stabat Mater. The Tallis Scholars, Dir. Peter Phillips. Gimell CDGIM 014.
- John Browne: Music from the Eton Choirbook. The Tallis Scholars, Dir. Peter Phillips. Gimell CDGIM 036.

== Bibliography ==
For a comprehensive description of the MS, and images, see Digital Image Archive of Medieval Music

- Benham, Hugh: Latin Church Music in England c. 1460-1575 (London, 1977), 58ff, passim [CCM descriptor(s): DpLpTpFpDis]
- Bent, Margaret; Bent, Ian; Trowell, Brian (eds.): John Dunstable complete works, Musica Britannica Vol. VIII (London, 1970) [2nd revised edn], X-XII
- Bent, Margaret; Bent, Ian: 'Dufay, Dunstable, Plummer-A New Source' Journal of the American Musicological Society XXII (1969), 394 - 424
- Blume, Friedrich (ed.): Die Musik in Geschichte und Gegenwart: Allgemeine Enzyklopädie der Musik (Kassel, 1949–79) [Cited by volume and column number], II, 1591–5, Tafel 48
- Bowers, Roger. 'Composers of the Eton Choirbook', in Oxford Dictionary of National Biography (2006)
- Cheung, Vincent C.K., Tudor Dedications to the Blessed Virgin: History, Style, and Analysis of Music from the Eton Choirbook.
- Curtis, Gareth; Wathey, Andrew: 'Fifteenth-Century English Liturgical Music: A List of the Surviving Repertory' RMA Research Chronicle 27 (1994), 1–69
- Fitch, Fabrice: 'Hearing John Browne's motets: registral space in the music of the Eton Choirbook', Early Music 36(1) (2008), 19–40
- Harrison, Frank Ll.: Music in Medieval Britain (London, 1963), 307–29
- Harrison, Frank Llewellyn: 'The Eton Choirbook: Its Background and Contents (Eton College Library ms. 178)' Annales Musicologiques I (1953), 151–75
- Harrison, Frank Llewellyn: 'The Eton College Choirbook (Eton College MS 178)', in International Musicological Society: Report of the 4th Congress, Utrecht 1952 (1952), 224–32
- Heminger, A. Music Theory at Work: The Eton Choirbook, Rhythmic Proportions and Musical Networks in Sixteenth-Century England. Early Music History, 37, (2018) 141–182.
- Hughes, Dom Anselm: 'The Eton Manuscript' Proceedings of the Royal Musical Association LIII (1926–7), 67–83
- James, Montague Rhodes: A Descriptive Catalogue of the Manuscripts in the Library of Eton College (Cambridge, 1895), 108–12
- Kirsch, Winfried: Die Quellen der mehrstimmigen Magnificat- und Te Deum Vertonungen bis zur Mitte des 16. Jahrhunderts (Tutzing, 1966), 135
- Phillips, Peter: 'Performance Practice in 16th-Century English Choral Music' Early Music VI (1978), 195-9 [CCM descriptor(s): FpDis]
- Phillips, Peter: 'Eton encounters; reflections on the Choirbook'. Musical Times 1939 (2017), 3-60.
- Sandon, Nicholas: 'Fragments of Medieval Polyphony at Canterbury Cathedral' Musica Disciplina XXX (1976), 37–53, 51–3
- Squire, W. Barclay: 'On an early Sixteenth Century MS. of English Music in the Library of Eton College' Archaeologia LVI (1898), 89–102
- Warren, Edwin B.: Life and Works of Robert Fayrfax, MSD Vol. 22 (American Institute of Musicology, 1969), 42
- Westrup, J. A.; et al., (eds.): New Oxford History of Music (London, New York, and Toronto, 1954-), III, Plate III
- Williams, Carol J.: 'The Salve Regina Settings in the Eton Choirbook' Miscellanea Musicologica [Adelaide] X (1979), 28-37 [CCM descriptor(s): LpDis]
- Williamson, Magnus: The Eton Choirbook, Facsimile with introductory study (Oxford: DIAMM Publications, 2010)
