= William Cornysh =

English composer and dramatist (1465–1523)

William Cornysh the Younger (also spelled Cornyshe, Cornishe or Cornish) (1465 – October 1523) was an English composer, dramatist, actor, and poet.

== Life ==
In his only surviving poem, which was written in Fleet Prison, Cornysh claims that he had been convicted based on false information and thus wrongly accused, though it is not known what the accusation was. He may not be the composer of the music found in the Eton Choirbook; it may have been created by his father, also named William Cornysh, who died c. 1502. The younger Cornysh had a prestigious employment at court as Master of the Children of the Chapel Royal; and being responsible for the musical and dramatic entertainments at court and during important diplomatic events such as at the Field of the Cloth of Gold in 1520; and visits to and from the courts of France and the Holy Roman Empire, which he fulfilled until his death. He died in 1523, his birth date unknown.

== Musical works ==
The Eton Choirbook (compiled c. 1490–1502) contains several works by Cornysh: Salve Regina (found in several other sources as well), Stabat mater, Ave Maria mater Dei, Gaude virgo mater Christi, and a lost Gaude flore virginali. The Caius Choirbook (c. 1518–1520) contains a Magnificat. Other sources refer to lost works: three Masses, another Stabat mater, another Magnificat, Altissimi potentia, and Ad te purissima virgo. He also produced secular vocal music and the notable English sacred anthem Woefully arrayed. There is also an extended and somewhat erudite three-part instrumental work based on steps of the hexachord and its mutations, Fa la sol, and another untitled piece. These secular works are found in the so-called Fayrfax Book (copied in 1501).

If all the earlier sacred music is by the same Cornysh (junior) as the secular music, then he was a composer of some breadth, although not without parallel. The works by "Browne" in the Fayrfax Book display a similar difference in style to those by the John Browne of the Eton Choirbook, but are probably the same composer nonetheless. The occurrence of Cornysh's Magnificat (in the same style as the Eton works) falls nearly two decades after the death of the older Cornysh, and thus is far more likely the work of the younger Cornysh, by then one of the country's most important musicians. Furthermore, the works by Cornysh in the Eton Choirbook seem to be amongst the most "modern" in that collection. While they do not pursue the simplifying approach of Fayrfax (an almost exact contemporary of Cornysh junior, and fellow at Court and Chapel), and remain in a more old-fashioned florid melodic style, they adopt proto-madrigalian manners (for example in the setting of words like "clamorosa", "crucifige" and "debellandum" in the Stabat mater) and have a particularly developed sense of tonal movement (for example, in the Stabat mater, the closing "Amen" features deliberate use of F sharps as leading notes to give a sense of tonal cadence into G, or employing E flats at "Sathanam" to give a tonal cadence onto B flat, emphasizing the "strong" nature of the text at that moment, employing the bass-movement V-I), as well as adopting a more modern sense of the expressive appoggiatura in melodic shapes and in bringing out the stresses of the Latin by such devices (for example, again the Stabat mater, the use of appoggiaturas in the Bassus part to express "ContriSTANtem et doLENtem" in the first few measures, and again at "Contemplari doLENtem cum filio?"), and the use of purely rhetorical gestures (such as the exclamation "O" by full choir in the middle of the soloists' section starting the Stabat mater). It is not impossible to see in these mannerisms the work of a great dramatist.

The works of John Browne are given pride of place in the Eton manuscript. It seems that in the examples given above that Cornysh may have been emulating Browne (his own Stabat mater features a celebrated madrigalian setting of "crucifige", and his O Maria salvatoris Mater features the exclamation "En" (="Oh") in a similar way to Cornysh's interjection in his Stabat mater).

Thus it seems that the Eton Cornysh was writing after Browne, and this would place his work amongst the later ones of the Eton Choirbook: additionally the approaches do not seem to be those of an older man, being much more suggestive of a young and original composer. The traditional ascription of all the works to Cornysh junior is the one more generally accepted. However, the possibility that the Eton works are the works of a generation earlier remains, and has interesting implications if true.

The musicologist David Skinner, in the booklet to The Cardinall's Musick's CD Latin Church Music, puts forward the proposition that the pre-Reformation Latin church music (including the works in the Eton manuscript) was composed by the father, whilst the son is the composer of the pieces in English and the courtly songs.
