= John Browne (composer) =

English composer

- Born: c. 1453
- Died: c. 1500
- Occupation: Composer
- Known for: Choral works in the Eton Choirbook
- Notable work: Stabat Mater, O Maria salvatoris mater
- Style: Tudor choral music

John Browne (1453–c. 1500) was an English composer of the Tudor period, who has been called "the greatest English composer of the period between Dunstaple and Taverner". Despite the high level of skill displayed in Browne's compositions, few of his works survive; Browne's extant music is found in the Eton Choirbook, in which he is the best-represented contributor, and the Fayrfax Manuscript. His choral music is distinguished by innovative scoring, false relations, and unusually long melodic lines, and has been called by early music scholar Peter Phillips "subtle, almost mystical" and "extreme in ways which apparently have no parallel, either in England or abroad."

== Life ==
Little is known of Browne's life. A John Browne from Coventry, believed to be the composer, was elected scholar of Eton in July 1467; he is described as having been 14 years of age at the time of his appointment, making him a slightly younger contemporary of Walter Lambe, who was likely at Eton during Browne's tenure. Nothing is known of his later career or death.

== Music ==
All of Browne's surviving works are found in the earlier folios of the Eton Choirbook, dating from between 1490 and 1500. According to the index of the Choirbook, ten more Browne compositions were originally included; five of these compositions have been lost, while two survive in fragmentary form. The first setting of the Salve regina, and the six part Stabat mater are perhaps best known today. His O Maria salvatoris - unusual at the time of composition in that it is set in eight-part polyphony - was highly regarded during his lifetime, and was placed at the front of the Eton Choirbook.

Browne's music is notable for its varied and unusual vocal instrumentation; each of his surviving works calls for a unique array of voices, with no two compositions sharing a given ensemble scoring. A prime example of Browne's penchant for unorthodox groupings is his six-voice antiphon Stabat iuxta, scored for a choir of four tenors and two basses. His choral music often displays careful treatment of the dramatic possibilities of the text and expressive use of imitation and dissonance; the aforementioned Stabat iuxta, in particular, has been noted for its "dense, almost cluster chords" and "harsh" false relations.

Other works have a wide range, with lower voices against soaring soprano lines. Though comparatively few in number compared with his continental contemporaries, Browne's works are expressively intense and often lengthy, several lasting a quarter of an hour or so to perform. Many of the composers in the Eton Choirbook are represented only in this manuscript, due to the dissolution of the monasteries and widespread destruction of untold numbers of Catholic music manuscripts in Henry VIII's reign. We may never know the actual output of Browne and his English contemporaries and subsequent English composers of the early 16th century.

== Works ==
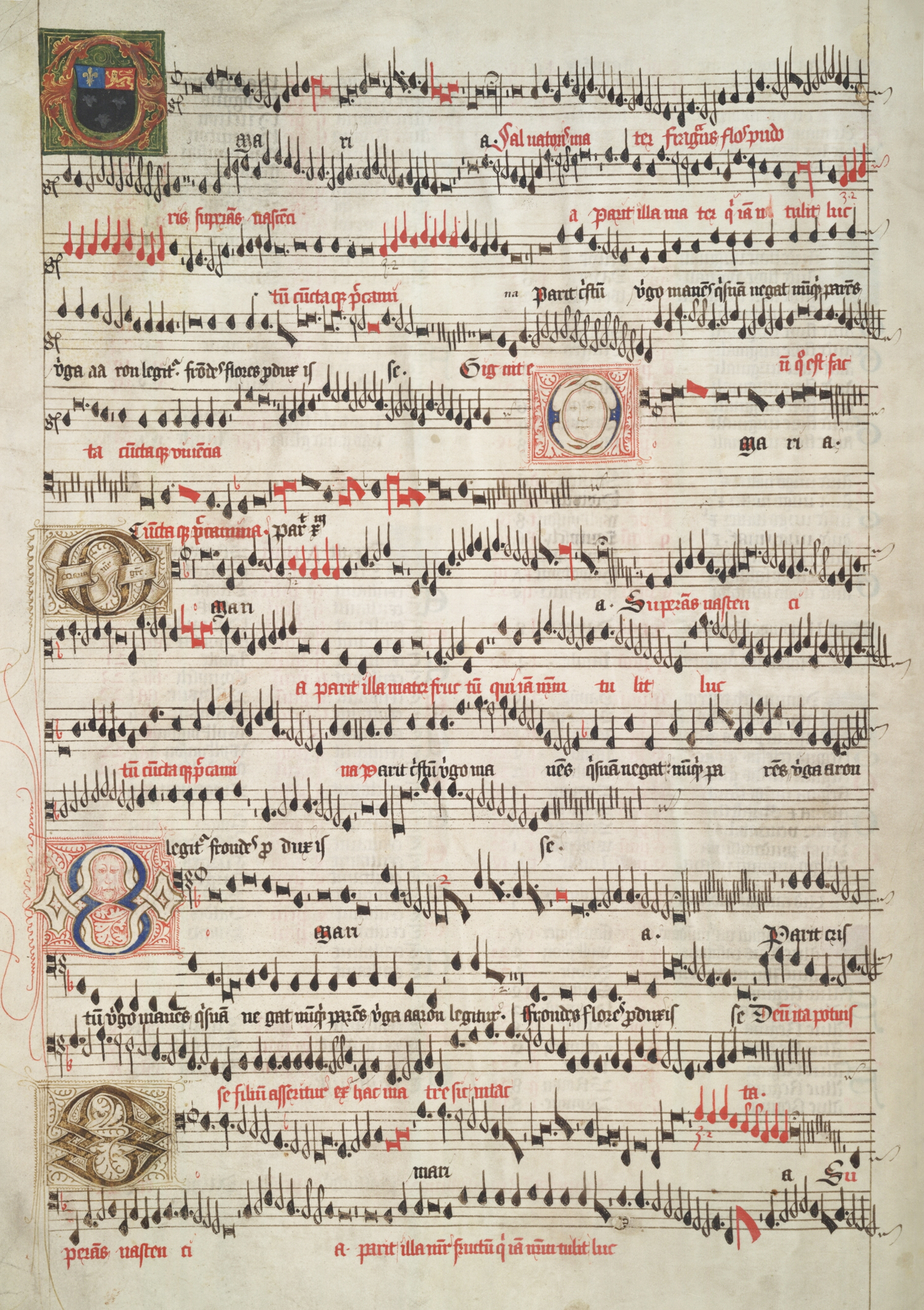
O Maria salvatoris mater in the Eton Choirbook

- O Maria salvatoris mater
- Stabat mater dolorosa
- Stabat virgo mater Christi
- Stabat juxta Christi crucem
- O regina mundi clara
- Salve regina mater misericordiae
- Salve regina mater misericordiae
- Ave lux totius mundi (lost)
- Gaude flore virginali (lost)
- O mater venerabilis
- Stabat virgo mater Christi
- Magnificat: Et exultavit spiritus meus (lost)
- Magnificat: Et exultavit spiritus meus
- Magnificat: Et exultavit spiritus meus (lost)
- Magnificat: Et exultavit spiritus meus (lost)
- Jesu, Mercy, How May This Be?
