= Walter Lambe =

15th-century English composer

Walter Lambe (1450–1? – after Michaelmas 1504) was an English composer.

His works are well represented in the Eton Choirbook. Also the Lambeth Choirbook and the Caius Choirbook include his works.

Born in Salisbury, Lambe was elected King's Scholar at Eton College in August 1467 aged 15. (Note: The identification of Walter Lamb the composer included in the Eton and other choirbooks, with Walter Lambe the King's Scholar of Eton is likely but not absolutely established.) By 1477 he was a clerk at Holy Trinity College, Arundel, (Note: At Holy Trinity College, Arundel was associated with the production of both the Lambeth and Caius choirbooks.) and in 1479 he moved to St George's Chapel, Windsor, as a clerk of the choir there.

== List of works in Eton Choirbook ==
- Ascendit Christus
- Gaude flore virginali (lost)
- Magnificat
- Nesciens mater virgo virum
- O Maria plena gratiae
- O Regina caelestis gloriae (lost)
- Salve regina
- Stella caeli
- Virgo gaude gloriosa (lost)

== Notes and references ==
Notes
