= Robert Fayrfax =

English composer (1464–1521)

- Born: 23 April 1464; Deeping Gate, England
- Died: 24 October 1521 (aged 57); St Albans

Robert Fayrfax (23 April 1464 – 24 October 1521) was an English Renaissance composer, considered the most prominent and influential of the reigns of Kings Henry VII and Henry VIII of England. He represents the third stage of the development of the English votive style in the Eton Choirbook and the Caius Choirbook.

== Biography ==
He was born in Deeping Gate, Lincolnshire, to William Fayrfax, Esquire, of Deeping Gate and Ann Tanfield, daughter of Robert Tanfield, Keeper of Arms of St Mary Aldermanbury. He had the patronage of the leading cultural figure of Henry VII's court, the king's mother Lady Margaret Beaufort (1443–1509). He became a Gentleman of the Chapel Royal by 6 December 1497. He was granted a chaplaincy of the Free Chapel at Snodhill Castle near Dorstone, a post which was given away a year later to Robert Cowper, another Gentleman. Fayrfax was at court at Richmond Palace on 28 March 1502 when Elizabeth of York, the wife of Henry VII, gave him 20 shillings for "setting an Anthem of oure lady and Saint Elizabeth". This 'Anthem' is almost certainly Eterne laudis lilium considering its acrostic ELISABETH REGINA ANGLIE ('Elizabeth Queen of England') and its references to both Mary and Elizabeth.

Fayrfax is reported as being the organist of St Albans Abbey responsible for the music there from 1498 to 1502. Fayrfax gained a Mus.B. from Cambridge in 1501, and a Mus.D. in 1504; he later acquired a D.Mus. from Oxford (by incorporation) in 1511. He became a member of the Fraternity of St Nicholas in 1502.

At the beginning of his reign in 1509, Henry VIII granted Fayrfax the annuity of a farm in Hampshire and later made him a 'Poor Knight of Windsor' (with a life-time award of twelve pennies a day) on 10 September 1514. He also possessed, and surrendered, two ecclesiastical livings. He received payments for clothes for state occasions and for tutoring choirboys. From 1516, for four consecutive years, he presented the king with collections of his compositions and received financial rewards. In 1520 he led the Chapel Royal in the state visit to France of the Field of the Cloth of Gold. He died in 1521, possibly at St. Albans, where he was buried.

== Work and influence ==
His surviving works are six masses, two Magnificats, thirteen motets, nine part-songs and two instrumental pieces. His masses include the 'exercise' for his doctorate, the mass O quam glorifica. One of his masses, Regali ex progenie, was copied at King's College, Cambridge and three other pieces (Salve regina, Regali Magnificat, and the incomplete Ave lumen gratiae) are in the Eton Choirbook. One of his masses, O bone Jesu, commissioned by Lady Margaret Beaufort, is considered the first Parody mass.

Posthumous admiration of Fayrfax is evident in some late sixteenth-century copies of his works. In a Bassus partbook in the Bodleian Library, Oxford containing a handful of Fayrfax's antiphons, several inscriptions accompany the composer's name 'Doctor Fayrfax': following Eterne laudis lilium, 'True & good (as usual)'; and following O Maria deo grata, 'Dignum doctore ut semper' ('worthy of the doctor as always').

He has been described as 'the leading figure in the musical establishment of his day' and 'the most admired composer of his generation'. His work was a major influence on later composers, including John Taverner (1490–1545) and Thomas Tallis (1505–85).

== Recordings ==
- The Masses (Missa O Quam Glorifica, Missa Tecum Principium, Missa Albanus, Missa O Bone Jhesu, Missa Regali Ex Progenie). Andrew Carwood/David Skinner: The Cardinall's Musick. ASV's Gaudeamus label: 3 CDs CDGAX353.
