= Peterhouse partbooks =

The Peterhouse partbooks are a collection of English partbooks dating from the sixteenth and seventeenth centuries. They are named "Peterhouse" after Peterhouse in Cambridge, where the books were kept for some time, and are now preserved in the Cambridge University Library. They are handwritten manuscripts, all written on paper. At some point in the mid-eighteenth century, the books were rebound, although the foliation and indices remained unchanged.

== Partbooks ==
In partbook format, each of the voice parts has its own book; hence, here, there are separate books for the Triplex, Medius, Contratenor, Tenor, Bassus, and Organ parts. Partbooks were a practical way of circulating polyphony; each voice part could be copied much more quickly in separate volumes than in score format, individual books used less paper overall than one single volume in score format, they were cheaper to produce and easier for larger groups to sing from, and each singer only needed to carry one smaller volume. However, the disadvantage to the partbook format is that a small individual volume was easy to lose, and if any of the partbooks went missing, the others were potentially rendered useless. Such is the case with the Peterhouse partbooks; only seventeen currently survive out of what appears to have originally been twenty-three books.

Other contemporary groups of partbooks, like the Peterhouse sets, include the Forrest-Heyther (Oxford, Bodleian Library, Mus.Sch.e.376–81), Baldwin (Oxford, Christ Church Library, Mus.979–83), Wanley (Oxford, Bodleian Library, Mus.Sch.e.420–22) and Gyffard (London, British Library, Add MSS 17802–17805) partbooks, as well as British Library Royal Appendix MSS 45–48, among others.

== Content ==
The partbooks can be divided up into two separate collections. The "Henrician" set consists of four surviving books (Triplex, Medius, Contratenor, and Bassus, MS. 31–32 and 40–41), with the Tenor book missing and with several pages missing from the beginning of the Triplex. These books contain pieces exclusively set in Latin; they were all written by a single scribe between 1539 and 1541, and do not seem to have been used much, as there are numerous errors that were never corrected. As such, it is possible that they were copied more like an anthology than a set for practical or current use, and as the English Reformation and the dissolution of the monasteries under Henry VIII continued, it may be that much of the repertory preserved in the partbooks fell from favor, or would have been considered politically ill-advised, shortly thereafter.

The "Caroline" set consists of nineteen books (MS. 31–53, minus the Henrician set listed above), four of which (two Tenor books, MS. 50 and 52, and two Contratenor books, MS. 51 and 53) have been lost. Although labelled 'former' and 'latter', the two sets are broadly contemporaneous; the 'latter' set however contains a number of works by Thomas Wilson, first organist at Peterhouse Chapel, who is not represented in the 'former' set; this may indicate a slightly later date for the 'latter' set. This collection dates to between 1625 and 1640, although they were assembled together later, and are much more diverse than the Henrician set. The books contain pieces in both Latin and English, including Services, and were copied by numerous scribes of varying ability, several of whom are composers of works in this set of partbooks.

The two sets are numbered inconsistently due to the order in which they were re-discovered. They were found, described, and cataloged by John Jebb, rector of Peterstow, Herefordshire, in the 1850s, at which point they were rebound in their current format. Some of the partbooks were found much later than others; three of those from the Caroline set, for example, were located in 1926 in a space behind the panelling of the Perne library, where presumably they had been hidden to protect them from the Puritans. Additionally, a second numbering system was applied to photocopies made of the partbooks, though these were made after the four lost books of the Caroline set went missing.

The music preserved in the partbooks is entirely sacred, consisting of Masses, Magnificats, Services, anthems, and motets. The partbooks are exceptional for their preservation both of famous composers, such as Thomas Tallis, William Byrd, and Robert Fayrfax, and much lesser-known composers such as Arthur Chamberlayne, John Darke, John Norman, and Johann Hector Beck. Only two works in the Henrician set are by non-English composers: the motet "Aspice Domine" is elsewhere ascribed to Jacquet de Mantua, and a Mass based on the motet "Surrexit pastor bonus" by Andreas de Silva is labeled by a "Lupus Italus" in the partbooks, but it is unclear who this composer might be.

A complete list of the composers represented in the Peterhouse partbooks is given below.

The repertoire in the Peterhouse partbooks shows considerable overlap with that preserved in other contemporary manuscripts: St John's College, Oxford, MS 180 & 181; the Christ Church Cathedral partbooks (Oxford, Christ Church Library, Mus.1220-1224; British Library Add MS 30478 & 30479; the Royal College of Music MSS 1045-1051; and Durham Dean and Chapter Library Mus. C1-19.

== Complete list of composers ==
=== Henrician set ===
- Anonymous
- William Alen
- Thomas Appleby
- Hugh Aston
- Richard Bramston
- Catcott
- Arthur Chamberlayne
- John Darke
- Edwarde
- Walter Erley [Erell]
- Robert Fayrfax
- Richard Hunt
- Robert Jones
- Thomas Knyght
- Nicholas Ludford
- Lupus/Lupus Italus
- Jacquet of Mantua
- Edward Martyn
- John Mason
- John Merbecke
- John Norman
- John Northbrooke [Northbroke]
- William Pasche
- Richard Pygott
- William Rasar [Rasor]
- Hugh Sturmys
- Thomas Tallis
- John Taverner
- Christopher Tye
- William Whytbrook [Whytbroke]

=== Caroline set ('Former' and 'Latter') ===
- Anonymous
- John Amner
- Adelard of Bath
- Adrian Batten [Battin, Battyn]
- Johann Hector Beck
- John Bennett
- Edward Blancke
- Thomas Boyce
- John Bull
- William Byrd
- William Child
- William Cranford [Cranforth]
- Richard Dering [Deering, Dearing, Diringus]
- Derrick Gerarde [Dethick, Dyricke, Theodoricus, Gerard, Gerardus, Gerrarde]
- Michael East
- John Ferrant [Farrant]
- Richard Ferrant
- Alfonso Ferrabosco
- John Fido [Fidoe, Fidow, Fidor]
- John Geeres
- Orlando Gibbons
- Gibbons/W. Smith
- Nathaniel Giles [Gyles]
- John Heath I
- John Hilton the Elder
- John Hilton the Younger
- Henry Hinde
- Edmund Hooper
- Hughes
- J. Hutchinson
- Richard Hutchinson
- Matthew Jeffries
- Juxon
- R. Knight
- Laud
- Henry Loosemore
- John Lugge
- Thomas Mace
- Marson
- Henry Molle
- Thomas Morley
- Henry Mudd [Harry, Moode, Moud, Mudge]
- William Mundy
- Henry Palmer
- Osbert Parsley
- Robert Parsons
- Nathaniel Patrick
- Martin Peerson [Pearson]
- Philips
- Richard Portman
- Robert Ramsey
- John Shepherd
- Edward Smith
- John Smith
- William Smith I
- Robert Stevenson
- William Stonard [Stoner, Stonerd, Stonnard]
- Nicholas Strogers
- Thomas Tallis
- John Taverner
- Thomas Tomkins
- Christopher Tye
- John Ward
- Thomas Warwick
- Thomas Weelkes
- Robert White [Whyte]
- William White
- Robert Wilkinson [Wylkynson]
- Thomas Wilson
- Leonard Woodson

== Modern recordings and reconstructions ==
Because of the missing partbooks, much of the music in the Peterhouse partbooks had not ever been recorded until recently. Nicholas Sandon, however, has spent numerous years researching the Peterhouse partbooks and has devoted considerable time to reconstructing lost vocal parts. Sandon was formerly Professor of Music at University College, Cork and at Exeter University, and now acts as general editor of Antico Edition, which is publishing his reconstructions of the music found in the Peterhouse Partbooks.

Based on Sandon's reconstructions, the Boston-based early music ensemble Blue Heron has released a five-CD series of music from the Henrician set of the Peterhouse partbooks, including compositions by Hugh Aston, Robert Jones, John Mason, Nicholas Ludford, Richard Pygott, and Robert Hunt. Additionally, the Seattle-based Byrd Ensemble released the album Our Lady: Music from the Peterhouse Partbooks, also based on Sandon's reconstructions, in 2011.

In 2025, a CD of music from the Caroline Partbooks was released by the choir for whom the manuscripts were originally collected. The recording by the Choir of Peterhouse, Cambridge, directed by Simon Jackson, working with historical advisor Matthew Alec Gouldstone, is released on the Naxos label. The performances are based on editions prepared by musicologist Matthew Alec Gouldstone, Antico edition, and others, and includes several world premiere recordings of music by Orlando Gibbons, Thomas Tallis, William Smith, and the first organist of Peterhouse Chapel in the 1630s, Thomas Wilson.
