= Gyffard partbooks =

The 'Gyffard' Partbooks (British Library [GB-Lbl] Add. MS 17802–5; also spelled Giffard) are an important set of English Renaissance choral partbooks, containing pieces by composers such as Thomas Tallis and John Sheppard, as well as additional unnamed composers, which are not found in other sources.

This set of four partbooks were probably mostly copied during the reign of Mary I for use at St. Paul's Cathedral, but copying continued to ca. 1580. They are named after one of their early owners, Philip Gyffard.

== Contents ==
The collection consists of mostly four-voice sacred a cappella choral music (though there are some 3- and 5-voice pieces). The music is arranged liturgically, and groups of similar pieces are also arranged by the seniority of the composer. It contains the following pieces:

No.	Composer	Title
1	Anonymous	Te Deum
2	Anonymous	Asperges me Domine (I)
3	Anonymous	Asperges me Domine (II)
4	Anonymous	Asperges me Domine (III)
5	Anonymous	Asperges me Domine (IV)
6	Philip van Wilder	Pater noster/Lord's Prayer
7	John Taverner	Kyrie Leroy
8	Hyett	Kyrie eleison
9	John Taverner	Alleluia (Salve virgo)
10	John Taverner	Alleluia (Veni electa mea)
11	Christopher Tye	Kyrie eleison
12	Christopher Tye	Alleluia
13	William Mundy	Kyrie eleison
14	William Mundy	Alleluia
15	John Hake	Kyrie eleison
16	William Mundy	Alleluia
17	Robert Okeland	Kyrie eleison
18	Thomas Knyght	Alleluia (Obtine sacris)
19	Thomas Tallis	Alleluia (Ora pro nobis)
20	John Sheppard	Alleluia (Ora pro nobis)
21	John Sheppard	Alleluia (Veni electa me)
22	John Sheppard	Alleluia (Virtutes caeli)
23	John Sheppard	Alleluia (Per te Dei genitrix)
24	John Taverner	Western Wind Mass
25	Christopher Tye	Western Wind Mass
26	John Sheppard	Western Wind Mass
27	John Sheppard	French Mass
28	John Sheppard	Mass 'Be not afraid'
29	Thomas Tallis	Mass for Four Voices / Plainsong Mass
30	John Taverner	Plainsong Mass
31	John Sheppard	Plainsong Mass for a Mean
32	Thomas Appleby	Mass for a Mean
33	John Taverner	Audivi vocem de caelo
34	Thomas Tallis	Audivi vocem de caelo
35	John Sheppard	Audivi vocem de caelo
36	Robert Cooper	Hodie nobis caelorum rex
37	John Taverner	Hodie nobis caelorum rex
38	Thomas Tallis	Hodie nobis caelorum rex
39	John Sheppard	Hodie nobis caelorum rex
40	John Taverner	In pace in idipsum
41	Thomas Tallis	In pace in idipsum
42	John Sheppard	In pace in idipsum
43	John Blitheman	In pace in idipsum
44	Christopher Tye	In pace in idipsum
45	John Sheppard	In manus tuas / Domine (I)
46	John Sheppard	In manus tuas / Domine (II)
47	John Sheppard	In manus tuas / Domine (III)
48	William Mundy	Exsurge Christe
49	Anonymous	Nos alium deum nescimus
50	Anonymous	O salutaris hostia
51	Robert White	Libera me domine de morte aeterna
52	Christopher Tye	Gloria laus et honor tibi
53	Anonymous	The Passion (according to St Matthew)
54	John Blitheman	Gloria laus et honor tibi (I)
55	John Blitheman	Gloria laus et honor tibi (II)
56	John Sheppard	Victimae paschali laudes [Alleluia (Confitemini domino)]
57	Thomas Knyght	In die pasce: Christus resurgens
58	John Redford	In die pasce: Christus resurgens
59	Robert Barber	Dum transisset sabbatum
60	Robert Johnson (I)	In die pasce: Dum transisset sabbatum
61	John Taverner	Dum transisset sabbatum
62	Anonymous	Vidi aquam egredientem
63	John Sheppard	Salve festa dies
64	Anonymous	Sedit angelus ad sepulchrum domini
65	Anonymous	In die ascensionis: Viri Galilaei quid admiramini
66	Anonymous	In die pentecostes: Spiritus sanctus procedens
67	Anonymous	Alma chorus Domini: Messias, Soter, Emanuel, Sabaoth
68	John Mundy	Kyrie Paschali
69	John Ensdale	In die pasce: Haec dies quam fecit dominus
70	John Sheppard	Laudate pueri: Sit nomen Domini
71	John Sheppard, William Byrd, John Mundy	In exitu Israel: Facta est Judaea sanctificatio eius
72	Anonymous	Proper for Jesus Mass: In nomine Jesu omne genuflectatur
	Anonymous	Proper for Jesus Mass: Gradual: Constituit Deus pater
	Anonymous	Proper for Jesus Mass: Alleluia: Deulce nomen
	Anonymous	Proper for Jesus Mass: Dulcis Jesus Nazarenus
73	William Whytbroke	Mass Upon the Square
74	William Mundy	Mass Upon the Square (I)
75	William Mundy	Mass Upon the Square (II)
76	William Mundy	Magnificat
77	Thomas Tallis	Magnificat
78	John Sheppard	Magnificat
79	John Taverner	Magnificat
80	Henry Stoning	Magnificat
81	Philippe van Wilder	Sancte Deus sancte fortis
82	Thomas Tallis	Sancte Deus sancte fortis
83	Richard Bramston	Recordare Domine testamenti tui
84	Christopher Tye	Sub tuam protectionem
85	Robert Johnson (I)	Gaude Maria virgo
86	Philip Alcoke	Salve regina
87	Anonymous	Sancta Maria virgo et mater
88	John Sheppard	Gaudete celicole omnes
89	Anonymous	Et portae inferi
90	Thomas Knyght	Sancta Maria virgo intercede
91	Christopher Hasjuns / Hoskins	Speciosa facta es
92	Thomas Wright	Nesciens mater virgo virum
93	Anonymous	Ave Maria gratia plena (I)
94	Anonymous	O bone Jesu

== See also ==
- Eton Choirbook
- Lambeth Choirbook
- Caius Choirbook
- Peterhouse partbooks
- The Mulliner Book, an instrumental collection
- List of Renaissance composers

== Sources ==
- The Gyffard Partbooks I and II edited by David Mateer. EARLY ENGLISH CHURCH MUSIC Volumes 48 and 51 (London: Stainer & Bell, 2007 and 2009)
- Roger Bray, 'British Museum Add. MSS. 17802-5 (The Gyffard Part-Books): An Index and Commentary', Royal Musical Association Research Chronicle 7 (1969), 31-50
- David Mateer, 'The "Gyffard" Partbooks: Composers, Owners, Date and Provenance', Royal Musical Association Research Chronicle 28 (1995), 21-50
