= Forrest-Heyther partbooks =

English manuscript music partbooks

The Forrest-Heyther partbooks (Oxford, Bodleian Library MS. Mus. Sch. e. 376–381) are a set of six manuscript partbooks copied in England in the sixteenth century. They are an important source of polyphonic Mass Ordinary settings by composers from the reign of Henry VIII, including John Taverner and Robert Fayrfax.

== Contents ==
All six partbooks (for treble, mean, contratenor, tenor and bass voices as well as a sixth additional part or sexta pars) contain eighteen five- and six-part polyphonic Mass Ordinary settings for unaccompanied voices.

1. John Taverner – Missa Gloria tibi Trinitas
2. Avery Burton – Missa Ut re mi fa sol la
3. John Merbecke – Missa Per arma iustitiae
4. Robert Fayrfax – Missa Regali ex progenie
5. Robert Fayrfax – Missa Albanus
6. William Rasar – Missa Christi Jesu
7. Hugh Aston – Missa Te deum laudamus
8. Robert Fayrfax – Missa O bone Jesu
9. Robert Fayrfax – Missa Tecum principium
10. Thomas Ashwell – Missa Jesu Christe
11. John Norman – Missa Resurrexit
12. John Taverner – Missa Corona spinea
13. Thomas Ashwell – Missa Ave Maria
14. Hugh Aston – Missa Videte manus meas
15. John Taverner – Missa O Michael
16. John Sheppard – Missa Cantate
17. Christopher Tye – Missa Euge bone
18. Richard Alwood – Missa 'Praise him praiseworthy'

The sexta pars partbook (e. 381) contains in addition three English-texted anthems: Sing joyfully unto God (William Byrd); Almighty God which by the leading of a star (attributed to John Bull); and O Lord consider my distress (anonymous).

== Physical characteristics ==
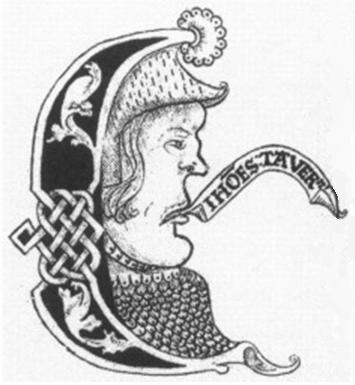
Possible likeness of John Taverner from the Forrest-Heyther partbooks

The treble, mean, contratenor, tenor and bass books are of identical appearance. They are bound in leather and the covers bear stamped images of the English royal coat of arms on one side, and a Tudor rose and a pomegranate on the other. The pomegranate was the symbol of Henry VIII's first wife Catherine of Aragon. John Bergsagel suggests that this shows the partbooks must have been bound before Henry and Catherine's divorce in 1533.

It is not known whose are the arms on the sexta pars book. However, the paper used in this partbook also appears in another source which dates from 1531.

In the treble, mean, contratenor, tenor and bass books, the initial letters of the Missa Gloria tibi trinitas are decorated with a face and a banner bearing the name of John Taverner. It has been assumed that this is a likeness of the composer.

== Copying history ==
It is not known who copied Masses 1–11 in the collection. It has been suggested that these Masses were copied at Cardinal College (now Christ Church, Oxford). This college had been founded in 1525 by Cardinal Wolsey, Henry VIII's Lord Chancellor. John Taverner was employed as Master of the Choristers at Cardinal College from 1527 until 1530, and it is possible that the partbooks were begun and bound at the college under his influence.

Masses 12–18 are in the handwriting of William Forrest and an inscription in the contratenor book reveals that he owned all the books in 1530. At that time, Forrest was a petty canon of Cardinal College. It is not known exactly when he copied the Masses, however. The presence of music by Sheppard and a reference to Tye's doctorate in the collection suggests that they were not added until at least 1545. It has been suggested that Forrest copied the Masses in the reign of Mary I of England, while acting as her personal chaplain. Forrest died in c. 1581, leaving the last four Masses incomplete.

Forrest's copies of Masses 15–18 were completed by John Baldwin, a singing-man at St George's Chapel, Windsor Castle and later a member of the English Chapel Royal. Baldwin was a prolific copyist who also copied the Baldwin Partbooks (Oxford, Christ Church MS. Mus. 979–983), part of the Dow Partbooks (Oxford, Christ Church MS. Mus. 984–988), and My Ladye Nevells Booke. He probably had the sexta pars rebound in the 1590s.

The three anthems in the sexta pars were added much later, probably in the 1610s or 1620s. It is possible that they were copied by William Heather (who joined the Chapel Royal in the year that Baldwin died) or Richard Nicholson, organist at Magdalen College, Oxford and later Professor of Music at Oxford University.

William Heather donated the partbooks to Oxford in 1627.

== See also ==
- Eton Choirbook
- Lambeth Choirbook
- Caius Choirbook
- Gyffard partbooks
- Peterhouse partbooks
- Baldwin partbooks
- Dow partbooks
- My Ladye Nevells Booke, a collection of keyboard works by William Byrd

== Sources ==
- Bergsagel, J, 'The Date and Provenance of the Forrest-Heyther Collection of Tudor Masses' Music & Letters 44 (1963), 240–248.
