= Osbert Parsley =

English composer and chorister (1510/11–1585)

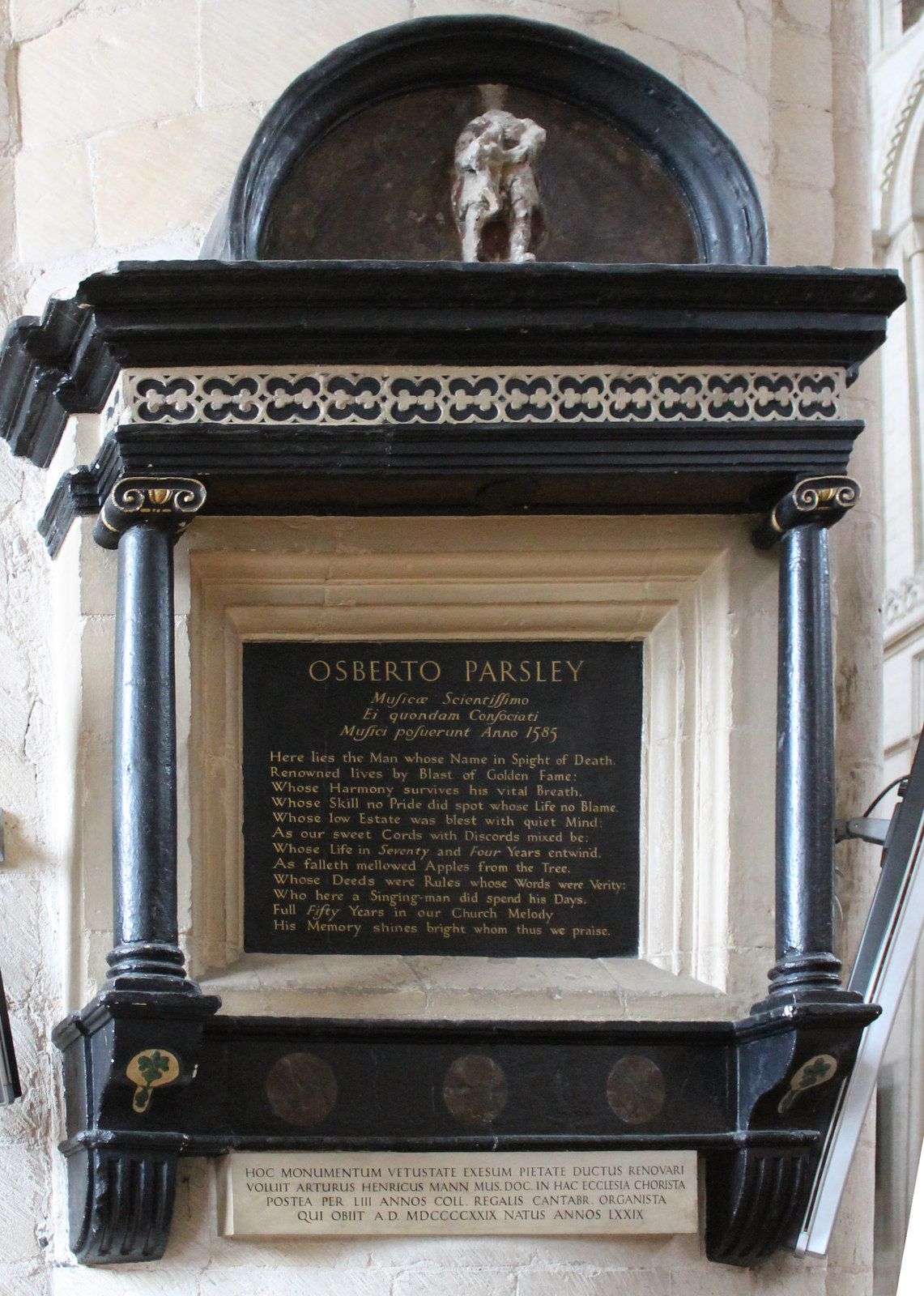
- The commemorative plaque to Parsley in Norwich Cathedral
- Born: 1510/1511
- Died: 1585 (aged around 74); Norwich, England
- Occupations: Composer; "singing man" (chorister)
- Era: Renaissance

Osbert Parsley (Note: Variations on Parsley's name include Persley, Parslove and Persleye.) (1510/1511 – 1585) was an English Renaissance composer and chorister. Few details of his life are known, but he evidently married in 1558, and lived for a period in the parish of St Saviour's Church, Norwich. A boy chorister at Norwich Cathedral, Parsley worked there throughout his musical career. He was first mentioned as a lay clerk, was appointed a "singing man" in c. 1534, and was probably the cathedral's unofficial organist for half a century. His career spanned the reigns of Henry VIII and all three of his children. After the Reformation of 1534, the lives of English church musicians changed according to the official policy of each monarch.

Parsley wrote mainly church music for both the Latin and English rites, as well as instrumental music. His Latin settings are considered to be more fluent and attractive-sounding than those he wrote to be sung in English. His longest composition, Conserva me, domine, has a graceful polyphonic style. Parsley's other liturgical works include Daily Offices (two morning services and an evening service), and the five-part Lamentations (notable for the difficulty in singing the top notes of the highest part). His instrumental music, nearly all for viols, including six consort pieces, was written in a style that combines both his Latin and English vocal styles. Some of his incomplete instrumental music has survived.

Parsley died in Norwich in 1585 and was buried in Norwich Cathedral, where there is a commemorative plaque, a mark of the respect in which he was held by those who knew him, and a unique honour for a chorister at the cathedral. The plaque is inscribed with a poem praising his character and musicianship. Parsley's music is occasionally heard in church services and concerts. Compositions that have been recorded include his Lamentations and Spes Nostra.

== Life and musical career ==
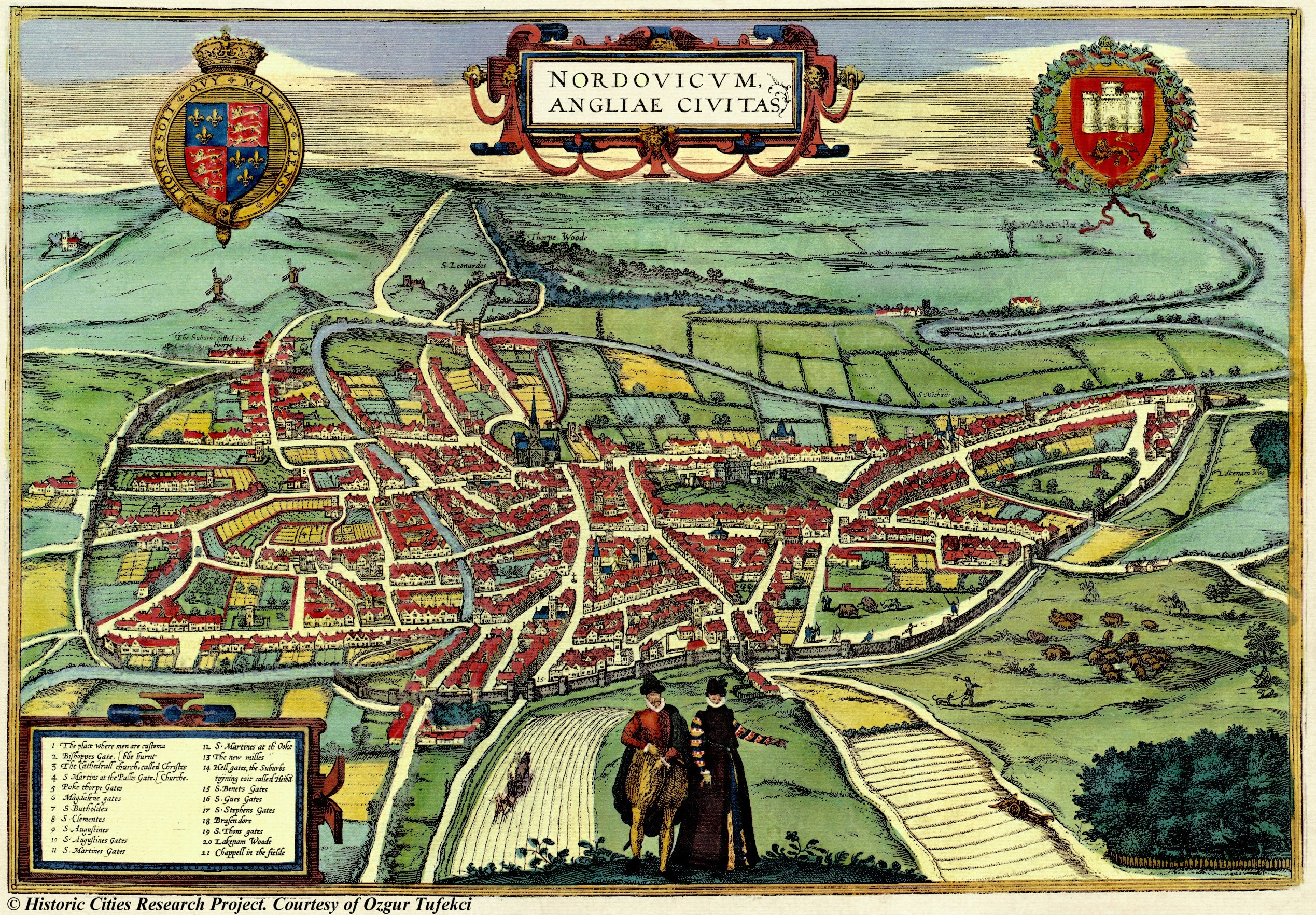
Norwich, as depicted in the Civitates Orbis Terrarum (1581)

Osbert Parsley was born in 1510 or 1511; (Note: The year of Parsley's birth has been calculated from his age and the year at the time of his death.) the identity of his parents and place of birth are unknown. Like many of his contemporary English composers, he began his musical career as a choirboy. During the time Parsley was a chorister, Edmund Inglott and his son William Inglott were in turn Master of the Choristers; the works written by William are found in the Fitzwilliam Virginal Book.

Parsley became a "singing man" c.1534, a post he retained for 50 years. The historian Noel Boston has conjectured that Parsley was either hired by the cathedral monks to assist them as a layman chorister, or was possibly a novice monk before his career as a monk was stopped short by the English Reformation, and he then was employed as a singing man. Parsley was first listed in Norwich Cathedral's extant accounts for 1538–1540, where he was named as a lay clerk, and he continued to be mentioned in the cathedral's records throughout his life. (Note: An Elizabethan singing man belonged to a respected occupation. Ernest Brennecke, professor of English at Columbia University, wrote that the term singing man was "specifically applied to professional musicians who performed the bass, tenor, and counter-tenor parts in the royal, cathedral, and university choirs.") It is likely that he acted as the cathedral's unofficial organist from 1535 until his death in 1585.

In 1558 Parsley was married to one Rose and bought a house and premises in the parish of St Saviour's Church, Norwich, from John Hering and his wife, Helen. Parsley owned the house until 1583. Details of Parsley's life were first published in Henry Davey's History of English Music, first published in 1895, when he was described as a "lesser composer" from Norwich Cathedral whose works existed in manuscript form. From his will it is known that there were seven surviving children from the marriage: Henry, Edmund, John, Joan, Elizabeth, Dorothy, and Anne.

Composers during the Tudor period were honoured by being awarded an academic degree from either Oxford or Cambridge, or by becoming a member of the Chapel Royal—Parsley received neither of these highly prized honours.

=== Later life (1570s and 1580s) ===
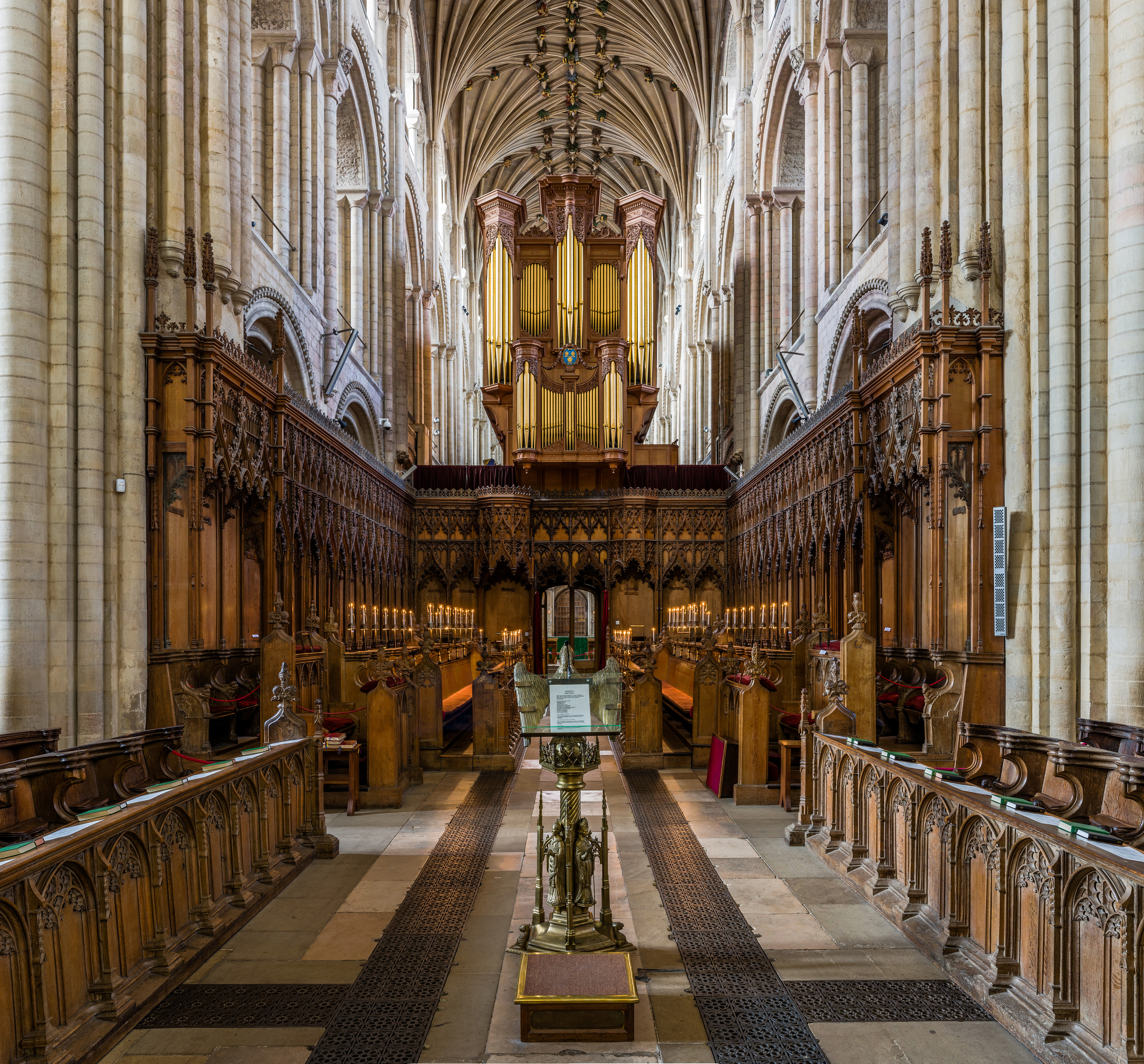
The quire in Norwich Cathedral, where Parsley was a chorister for over 50 years

By the start of the 1570s, Parsley was being paid £12 a year, and the five other men in the cathedral choir were paid either £10 or £8, equivalent to the pay given to an unskilled construction worker. A decade later, the cathedral choirmaster, responsible for both the men's and boys' choirs, was being paid £12. The composer Thomas Morley, master of the choirboys from 1583, had a salary not much more than those of the singing men.

In 1578, Elizabeth I and her court came to Norwich as part of a royal progress, and the city was expected to provide accommodation, banquets and entertainment. Then the second city in England after London, Norwich was one of the few cities in the kingdom with such sufficient numbers of skilled musicians, but even so it had to resort to using viol, trumpet and cornett players from Elizabeth's entourage. Elizabeth, in the company of her courtiers, the most prominent of Norwich's citizens, and the clergy of the cathedral, heard a Te Deum by Parsley sung during the first evening of her visit, with the choir being supported by the city's waits. Parsley was paid 6 1/2 shillings for the songs he had written and sung during the queen's visit. His music was also performed before Elizabeth when she returned to Norwich in 1597. None of his compositions for her visits to Norwich have survived.

=== Death and commemoration ===
In 1580, Parsley's name appeared at the top of the list of lay clerks in the Norwich Cathedral audit book. His will, made on 9 December 1584, was proved by his widow on 6 April of the following year. He died in Norwich in 1585, aged around 74, and was buried in the cathedral where he had worked throughout most of his life. He left bequests valued at about £75. (Note: A Tudor pound (£1) was worth approximately £200 in 2017, so in modern terms, Parsley's bequests amounted to over £15,300.) A friend of four Bishops of Norwich—Richard Nykke, Thomas Thirlby, John Parkhurst and Edmund Freke—Parsley was also well respected by his contemporaries for his musical ability and his personal character. His fellow lay singing men honoured him by commissioning a commemorative plaque—uniquely for a lay clerk in an English cathedral—in the north aisle.

The plaque to Parsley, which once had indecipherable text, was restored in 1930 as a memorial to the composer and organist Arthur Mann. (Note: Mann, who was organist at King's College, Cambridge for over 50 years, had been a boy chorister at Norwich Cathedral.) It was unveiled during an evensong service on 10 July 1930, with music by Parsley and Mann sung by the choirs of King's College, Cambridge, Ely Cathedral, and Norwich Cathedral. The text of the memorial reads:

Musicae Scientissimo
Ei quondam Consociati
Musici posuerunt Anno 1585

Here lies the man whose Name in Spight of Death,
Renowned lives by Blast of Golden Fame:
Whose Harmony survives his vital Breath.
Whose Skill no Pride did spot whose Life no Blame.
Whose low Estate was blest with quiet Mind:
As our sweet Cords with Discords mixed be:
Whose life in Seventy and Four Years entwin'd,
As falleth mellowed Apples from the Tree.
Whose Deeds were Rules whose Words were Verity:
Who here a Singing-man did spend his Days.
Full Fifty Years in our Church Melody
His Memory shines bright whom thus we praise.

== Composing career ==
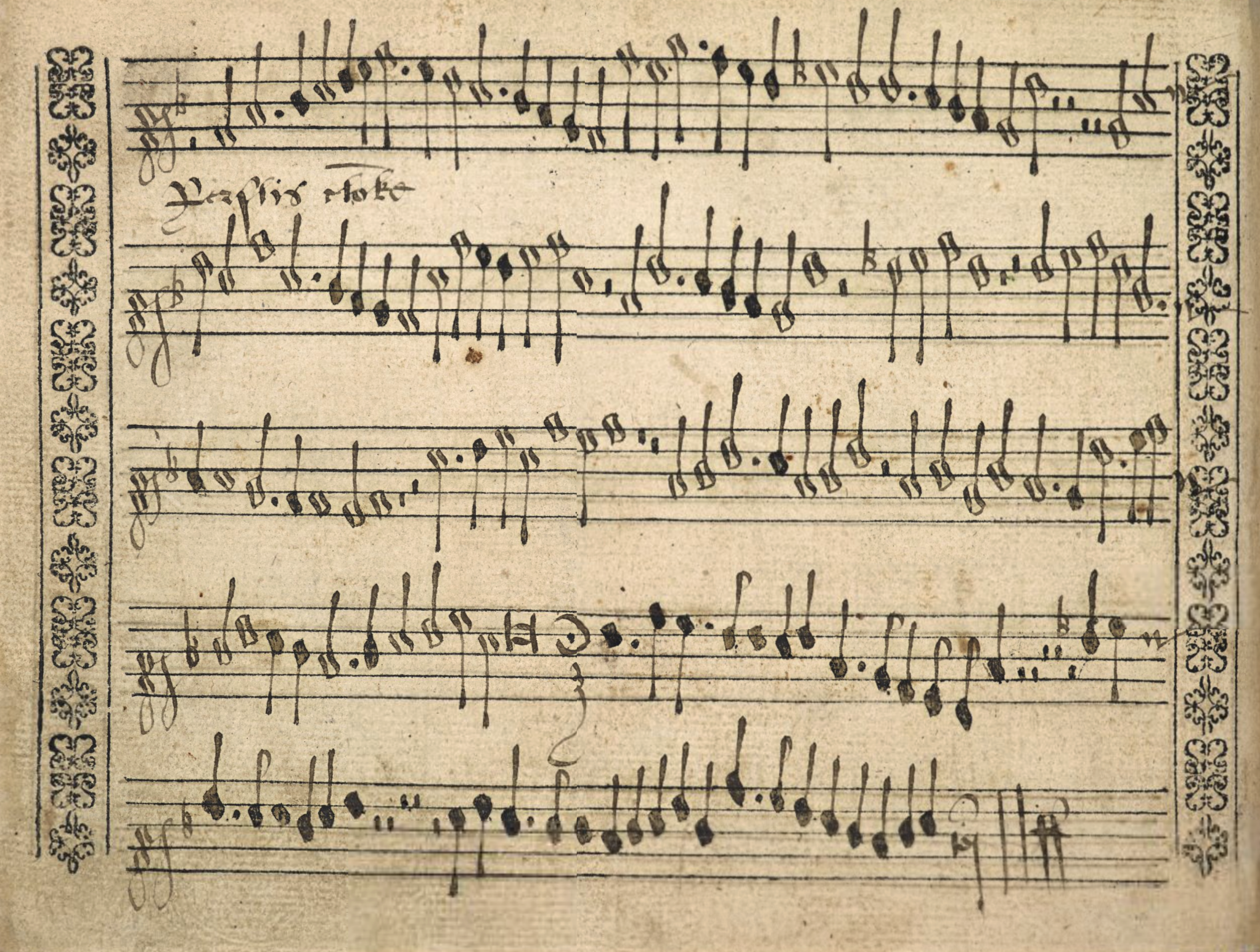
The treble line of "Parsley's Clock" (Add MS 30480, British Library)

English composers of the late 15th century and early 16th century set a limited number of types of sacred music, each with a clear place in the liturgy. Until the Reformation of 1534, when Henry VIII broke with the Catholic Church, English composers based their works on the Sarum rite, abolished in 1547. During the decades following the Reformation, the lives of English church musicians changed according to the policies of the reigning monarch. Henry allowed church music in England to continue to be written in a florid style, and use Latin texts, but during the reign of his son and successor, Edward VI, highly polyphonic music was no longer permitted, and the authorities destroyed church organs and music, and abolished choral foundations. These changes were never completely reverted by Edward's successor Mary during her brief reign; their half-sister Elizabeth, who succeeded Mary in 1558, confirmed or reinstated some of Edward's work.

Parsley's compositional career spanned the reigns of all four monarchs. He wrote church music for both the Latin and English rites. His Anglican church music for the Daily Office included a morning service, involving the Benedictus canticle and the Te Deum, and an evening service that involved the singing of two canticles, the Magnificat and the Nunc dimittis.

The musicologist Howard Brown noted that Parsley belonged to a group of outstanding composers from the middle period of the 16th century—William Mundy, Robert Parsons, John Sheppard, Christopher Tye, Thomas Tallis, and Robert White—who together produced a body of high quality music.

According to the scholar John Morehen, Parsley was less at ease when working with English texts, a trait Morehen finds Parsley had in common with similar Reformation composers. His Latin music is fluent and attractive, with extended phrases that become increasingly melismatic as they progress. The parts in Latin are characteristically independent in a way that was typical of sacred polyphony in England before the Reformation. The expressive psalm Conserva me, domine has an elegant polyphonic style. The technique shown in his English church music is less assured than his compositions for the Latin rite. His five-part Lamentations, which differs from settings by his contemporaries Tallis and White in that a treble line (notable for the difficulty in singing the highest notes of the part) is maintained throughout, was probably intended for domestic devotional use. During the 1920s, the musicologist and composer W. H. Grattan Flood described Parsley's Lamentations as being "of particular interest". One piece, a well-crafted three-part canonic setting of the Salvator Mundi, was printed by Morley in 1597. Morley described Parsley's arrangement of this Gregorian hymn as a model of its kind, and alluded to him as "the most learned musician".

Some of Parsley's instrumental music, nearly all for viols, survives, including six consort pieces; both his Latin and English vocal styles can be found in his instrumental style. The composition known as "Parsley's Clock" is similar to both Charles Butler's "Dial Song", and "What strikes the clocke?" by the English choirmaster and composer Edward Gibbons and a second anonymous piece, which were built around a line that counts the hours.

Peter Phillips, writing in The Musical Times, in commending Conserva me, domine, noted that "Parsley can be remembered as one of those men who just once conjured up a masterpiece, as it seems to us now, from nowhere."

== Compositions ==
"Parsley's Clock" (length 1 minute 34 seconds, transcribed for a quintet of recorders)

Parsley's surviving works consist mainly of church music from several locales. His choral works set to Latin texts include Conserva me, domine, his most substantial work; and the Lamentations; those set to texts in English, written after the Dissolution, are his two Morning Services, each consisting of a Benedictus canticle and a Te Deum; an Evening Service previously attributed to Tye; and the anthem "This is the Day the Lord has made". Other compositions known to have been written by Parsley include Spes nostra, a motet for five viols; five In Nomine; "O praise the Lord all ye heathen", a tenor part recently found in a prayer book; a hymn Salvator mundi domine; a Service in C major; Super septem planetarum and the work known as "Parsley's Clock". Several examples of incomplete instrumental music have also survived.

Of the four of the great Lamentations of the Tudor period for Holy Week date from the 1560s, two were composed by Tallis, and one each by William Byrd and Parsley. Earlier Lent services avoided polyphony, which was regarded as lacking in solemnity. The Oxford Dictionary of National Biography describes Parsley's Lamentations as his most famous work.

=== Existing manuscripts ===
Key

BL—British Library, London; BodL—Bodleian Library, Oxford; ERO—Essex Record Office, Chelmsford; PC—Peterhouse, Cambridge; QC—Queens' College, Cambridge; RCM—Royal College of Music; JO—Private collection of David McGhie, London; Private library of J. A. Owens, Davis, California; f.—folio, r,v—recto and verso; vv—voices.

==== Music for voices ====
Composition	Description	Manuscript name	Location
Conserva me, domine	Complete work (a setting of Psalm 16, written as a motet for five voices)	Sadler Partbooks: MSS Mus. e.1–5	BodL
Conserva me, domine	Opening duo	Add MS 29246 (Paston MS) (f. 8v)	BL
Conserva me, domine	Bass line only	MS Tenbury 1464	BodL
Conserva me, domine	Bass line only	Petre MS D/DP Z6/1	ERO
Conserva me, domine	Three parts only	MS Tenbury 342	BodL
Conserva me, domine	Three parts only	MS 2035	RCM
Lamentations	Setting (Mem: Cui comparabo) for five voices, complete work	Mus. e. 1–5 (Sadler Partbooks)	BodL
Evening Service	Liturgical work written in G minor. containing a Magnificat and a Nunc dimittis	MSS 34, 36, 37, 42, 44	PC
Two Morning Services	Liturgical works, each containing a Benedictus and Te Deum	Add MSS 30480–30483	BL
Two Morning Services	Liturgical works, each containing a Benedictus and Te Deum	MS 35–37, 42–45 (Peterhouse Partbooks)	PC
Multiplicati	A setting of "Their sorrows shall be multiplied", part of Psalm 16 (fragment)	MS 1737	RCM
"O praise the Lord all ye heathen"	Half a page of music from a personal copy of the tenor part of one or more partbooks	Old Library G.4.17	QC
"This is the day the Lord has made"	Anthem for four voices, based on a text from Psalm 118	MSS 35–37, 42–44 (Peterhouse Partbooks: Latter Caroline Set)	PC (Note: Manuscripts of This is the Day can also be found at the Bodleian Library and at the New York Public Library, according to Grove Music Online.)

==== Instrumental music ====
===== Complete works =====
Composition	Description	Manuscript name	Location
In Nomine	Piece for four players, probably viols	MS Mus. Sch. d. 212; MSS Mus. Sch. d. 213–216	BodL
In Nomine	Piece for four players, probably viols	MS Mus. Sch. d. 212; MSS Mus. Sch. d. 213–216	BodL
In Nomine	Piece for five players, probably viols	MS Mus. Sch. d. 212; MSS Mus. Sch. d. 213–216	BodL
"Parsley's Clock"	Piece for five players	Add MSS 30480–30484 (Hamond Partbooks, written as "Perslis clo[c]ke")	BL
"Parsley's Clock"	The song upon the dial	MS Tenbury 1464	BodL
Salvador mundi domine	Hymn in three parts, probably for viols. Printed in Plaine and Easie Introduction to Practicall Musicke by Thomas Morley (1597)	–	JO
Spes nostra	Motet for five viols	Add MS 31390	BL

===== Incomplete works =====
Composition	Description	Manuscript name	Location
Benedicum domino	A setting of "I will bless the Lord", part of Psalm 16, arranged for lute	Add MS 29246	BL
Conserva me. domine (a setting of Psalm 16)	Arranged for three lutes	Add MS 29246	BL
In Nomine (of 5 parts upon 5 minims) (Note: There is a Parsley In Nomine in the British Library manuscript Add MS 32377, which is a discantus partbook, linked with one of the MS. Tenbury 1464 In Nomines.)	A single surviving part (bassus) of a piece for five players, probably for viols	MS Tenbury 1464	BodL
In Nomine (Jesu)	A single surviving part (bassus) of music in five parts of a piece for five players, probably for viols	MS Tenbury 1464	BodL
Multiplicati (A setting of "Their sorrows shall be multiplied", part of Psalm 16)	Incomplete, arranged for three lutes	Add MS 29246	BL
Multiplicati (A setting of "Their sorrows shall be multiplied", part of Psalm 16)	Incomplete, arranged for three lutes	MS 2035	RCM
"Parsley's Clock"	A single surviving part from a Discantus partbook, which once would have been one of six volumes	McGhie manuscript	DM
"Super septem planetarium"	An undesignated single part for a consort piece	MS Tenbury 1464	BodL

== Recordings and performances ==
CD recordings of some of Parsley's compositions have been made, and his music continues to be heard in church services and concerts.

Year	Album	Piece	Publisher
1992	Morley, Parsley and Inglott	Conserva me, domine; Lamentations	Priory Records
2005	Musik der Tudor – Zeit Messen und Motetten	Lamentations	Sony BMG Music Entertainment
2009	The Lamentations of Jeremiah	Lamentations	Delphian
2014	Serenissima: Music from Renaissance Europe	In Nomine	Delphian
2015	As Our Sweets Cords with Discords Mixed Be	In Nomine; "Parsley's Clock"	Resonus Classics
2017	Cosmography of Polyphony: A Journey Through Renaissance Music with 12 Recorders	Spes Nostra	Pan Classics
2018	Æternum: Music of the Elizabethan Avant Garde from Add. MS 31390	Spes Nostra	Olde Focus Recordings

== Sources ==
- Boston, Noel (1963) [1938–1939]. The Musical History of Norwich Cathedral. Norwich: The Friends of Norwich Cathedral. OCLC 450763.
- Boyd, Morrison Comegys (1962). Elizabethan Music and Musical Criticism (2nd ed.). Philadelphia: University of Pennsylvania Press. OCLC 599711.
- Brennecke, Ernest (1951). "Shakespeare's 'Singing Man of Windsor'". Publications of the Modern Language Association of America. 66 (6). Cambridge: Cambridge University Press: 1188–1192. doi:10.2307/460166. JSTOR 460166. S2CID 164007359.
- Brown, Howard Mayer (1976). Music in the Renaissance. Prentice Hall History of Music Series. Englewood Cliffs, New Jersey: Prentice Hall. ISBN 978-01360-8-505-8.
- Butler, Katherine (2015). Music in Elizabethan Court Politics. Woodbridge, Suffolk: Boydell Press. ISBN 978-18438-3-981-1.
- Davey, Henry (1921) [1895]. History of English Music (2nd ed.). London: J. Curwen. OCLC 890125681.
- Dovey, Zillah (1996). An Elizabethan Progress: The Queen's Journey Into East Anglia, 1578. Phoenix Mill: Fairleigh Dickinson University Press. ISBN 978-08386-3-721-0.
- Fellowes, Edmund H. (1969). English Cathedral Music (5th ed.). London: Methuen. ISBN 978-04161-4-850-3.
- Gant, Andrew (2017). O Sing Unto the Lord: A History of English Church Music. Chicago: University of Chicago Press. ISBN 978-02264-6-962-1.
- Grattan Flood, W. H. (1925). "New Light on Late Tudor Composers: XIII. Osbert Parsley". The Musical Times. 66 (993). London: Musical Times Publications (United Kingdom): 990. doi:10.2307/911434. JSTOR 911434.
- Kerman, Joseph (1998). "On William Byrd's Emendemus in melius". In Pesce, Dolores (ed.). Hearing the Motet: Essays on the Motet of the Middle Ages and Renaissance. New York; Oxford: Oxford University Press. ISBN 978-01953-5-165-1.
- Milsom, John (1997). "The Passing of Time". Early Music. 25 (4 (25th Anniversary Issue)). Oxford: Oxford University Press: 583–588. doi:10.1093/earlyj/XXV.4.583. JSTOR 3128406.
- Morehen, John (1974). "The Instrumental Consort Music of Osbert Parsley". The Consort. 30. Hazlemere, UK: Dolmetsch Foundation: 67–72. ISSN 0268-9111.
- Morley, Thomas (1608). A Plaine and Easie Introduction to Practicall Musicke. London: Humpfrey Lownes. OCLC 965139297.
- Murray, Tessa (2014). Thomas Morley: Elizabethan Music Publisher. Woodbridge, Suffolk: Boydell Press. ISBN 978-18438-3-960-6.
- Oxford University (1937). "Reviews of Music". Music and Letters. 18 (2). Oxford: Oxford University Press. doi:10.1093/ml/XVIII.2.218-a.
- Phillips, Peter (1997). "Voices from Nowhere". The Musical Times. 138 (1855). London: Musical Times Publications (United Kingdom): 16–21. doi:10.2307/1003540. JSTOR 1003540.
- Unger, Melvin P. (2010). Historical Dictionary of Choral Music. Lanham, Maryland: Scarecrow Press. ISBN 978-08108-7-392-6.
- Waters, Charles F. (1930). "The 'Hymn-Anthem': A New Choral Form". The Musical Times. 71 (1049). London: Musical Times Publications (United Kingdom): 632–635. doi:10.2307/916038. JSTOR 916038.
- Willis, Jonathan (2013). Church Music and Protestantism in Post-Reformation England: Discourses, Sites and Identities. Farnham, UK: Ashgate Publishing Limited. ISBN 978-14094-8-081-5.
