= Ludford =

Ludford may refer to:

== Places ==
=== England ===
- Ludford, Lincolnshire, a village and parish in Lincolnshire
  - RAF Ludford Magna, a former Royal Air Force base in Lincolnshire
- Ludford, Shropshire, a village and parish in Shropshire (formerly in Herefordshire)

== People ==
=== Surname ===
- Sarah Ludford, Baroness Ludford (b. 1951), a British politician
- Nicholas Ludford, English Renaissance composer
- Simon Ludford, English physician

=== First name ===
- Ludford Docker (b. 1860), an English businessman and cricketer
