= William Mundy (composer) =

English composer (c. 1529–1591)

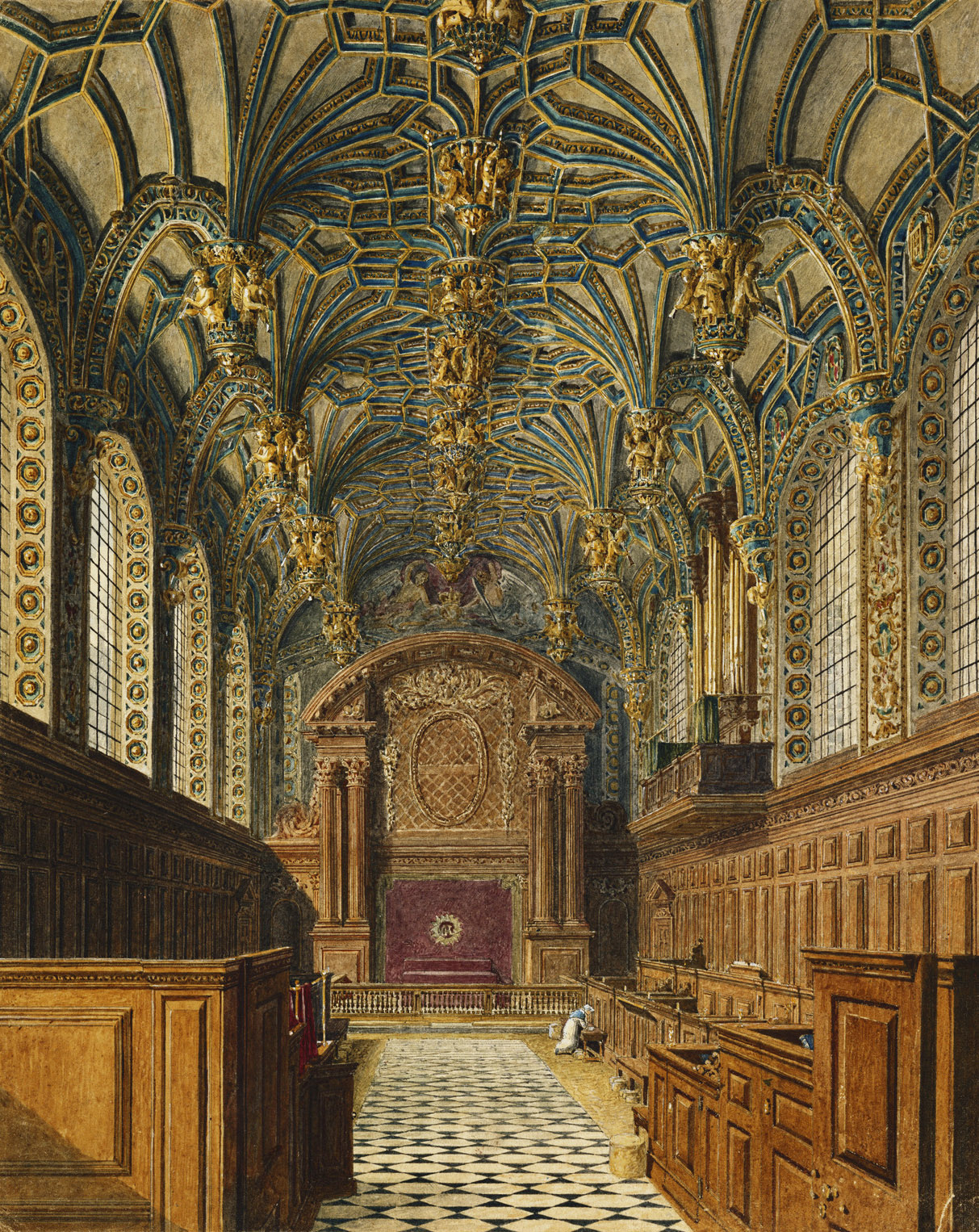
The Chapel Royal at Hampton Court Palace where William Mundy spent most of his career

William Mundy (c. 1529–1591) was a Renaissance English composer of sacred music and father of composer John Mundy. Over four hundred years after his death, William Mundy's music is still performed and recorded.

== Life ==
Mundy was the son of Thomas Mundy, a musician and sexton of the London church St Mary-at-Hill. William Mundy married Mary Alcock and had two sons, John Mundy, an organist and composer, and Stephen Mundy, a gentleman of the household to James I and Charles I.

In 1543, William Mundy was head chorister of Westminster Abbey, until his voice broke. He was appointed deputy to St Martin, Ludgate in 1547, and from 1548 to 1558 Mundy served as Parish Clerk for the church of St Mary-at-Hill in London (his father Thomas' employer). Mundy was appointed Vicar choral to the Chapel Royal in 1559, and as a Gentleman of the Chapel in 1564, and remained in that position for twenty-seven years until his death around early October 1591. (Note: Most sources cite 1591 as William Mundy year of death, but the Dictionary of National Biography suggests that the commonly held 1591 date instead refers to the death of a relative—John Mundy (but not his son John).)

== Works ==
=== Overview ===
Coming of age during the reign of Henry VIII, Mundy's career spanned much of England's Tudor Dynasty, and reflected the changes in church music that accompanied the religious turmoil of that period. Mundy's earliest surviving works, a Magnificat, Mass Apon the Square I, Mass Apon the Square 2, an Alleluia Post partum, a Alleluia Per te Dei, and a Kyrie, possibly date from the 1550s, and appear in the Gyffard Partbooks. Mundy's extant body of sacred music consists of the two masses above, six Anglican service settings, the single Kyrie, twenty-two motets (in Latin), thirteen anthems, and a large number of musical settings for specific Psalms. These settings included his versions of Miserere mei Deus (from Psalms 51), Adolescentulus sum ego (from Psalms 119), In aeternum (also from Psalms 119), and Let the sea make a noise (from Psalms 98), which was composed for twelve instruments. Towards the end of his career, Mundy remained innovative as English sacred music continued to transform during the Elizabethan era. He was a pioneer of the genre of verse anthem with organ accompaniment (along with Richard Farrant and William Byrd) in works such as Ah, helpless wretch and The secret sins.

=== Vox patris caelestis ===
One of Mundy's most famous works, Vox patris caelestis (Voice of the heavenly Father), is a complex antiphon on the Assumption of the Virgin Mary, referencing the Song of Songs and other scripture and literary works related to the Assumption. Most musicologists definitively date Vox Patris caelestis to the brief English Counter-Reformation during the reign of Queen Mary (1553–58) due both to its subject matter and Catholic style. Milsom hypothesises it was used for her proclamation as queen or for the day of her coronation pageantries. English tenor and historian of Tudor music, Nicholas Robertson cites Vox patris caelestis as "the culmination of the great antiphon tradition" and describes its structure as beginning "with two voices only, expanding to a trio before the full choir enters with éclat in the second half, now in duple instead of triple time, the solo sections are enlarged in scope, climaxing in a "gymel" (derived from the Latin for twin) where two equal treble voices soar above the rich accompaniment of double alto and bass", and praises it as "elaborate and virtuosic, the range daunting".

=== Oh Lord, the Maker of All Things ===
Another of Mundy's best known pieces, the service setting, Oh Lord, the Maker of All Things, first published in Barnard's partbook (First Book of Selected Church Musick), was—bizarrely—originally attributed to Henry VIII. Composer and music historian Ernest Walker, held that particular contrapuntal service to be "one of the very finest of all written for the English ritual".

=== Other works ===
Other works by Mundy that have survived to the present day include In exitu Israel, an extensive setting of Psalm 114 (113 in the Vulgate) rivalling Vox patris in scale and complexity; this seems to have been a collaborative work between the young William Byrd, the more senior John Sheppard, and Mundy himself, with each composer responsible for a section of the text. Also extant in a slightly reconstructed form is the large-scale motet Maria virgo sanctissima, a comparable work to Vox patris and similarly devoted to the Virgin Mary. Smaller works include Beatus et sanctus, two settings of Alleluia, Per te Dei genitrix, Sive vigilem and Adolescentulus sum ego.

=== Mundy—William or John? ===
Some compositions, ascribed merely to "Mundy", may have been the work of either William Mundy, or his son John. These include six service settings, four complete anthems for men's voices, an anthem for a full choir (Blessed is God in All His Gifts), four incomplete anthems, and a secular work (Fie, fie my fate).

== Reputation among contemporaries ==
Though few records of Mundy's life remain, he was highly regarded by his contemporaries. Thomas Morley in his 1597 Plaine and Easie Introduction to Practicall Musicke grouped Mundy in among the top English composers of the time, writing that "[...] those famous Englishmen who have been nothing inferior in Art to any of the a forenamed [continental composers], as Fairfax, Taverner, Sheppard, Mundy, White, Parsons, W. Byrde, and divers others, who never thought it a greater sacrilege to spurn against the Image of a Saint, than to take to perfect cords of one kind together."

In 1563, when composer John Baldwin of Windsor wrote of the great musicians of the period, he included Mundy ("th'oulde", as opposed to his son John) writing: "I will begin with White, Sheppard, Tye, and Tallis; / Parsons, Giles, Mundy, th'oulde: one of the Queen's Pallis." English Renaissance academic Robert Dow also praised Mundy in verse, writing: "Moon day: / As the light of the moon follows close on the sun / So you after Byrd, Mundy, next do come." Dow included one of Mundy's compositions in his manuscript currently known as the Dow Partbooks.

== See also ==
- List of Renaissance composers

== List of works ==
A complete list of Mundy's compositions, including delineations of language and instrumentation, can be found at the correlating entry on ChoralWiki.

=== Motet ===
- Per te Dei genitrix (for SATB)
- 1575: Adolescentulus sum ego (for SATB)
- 1578: In Aeternum (for 6 voices)
- 1575: Maria virgo sanctissima (for 6 voices)
- 1575: Beatus et sanctus (for 5 voices)
- 1575: Sive vigilem (for 5 voices)
- 1641: O Lord, the Maker of All Things (for 4 voices with continuo)

=== Chamber ===
- Fantasia a 5 (for five viols)
- In Nomine (for five instruments)
- O Mater Mundy (for five instruments)
- Sermone Blando (for five unspecified instruments)

=== Choral ===
- A New Commandment (for SATB)
- In exitu Israel (for TTBB)
- 1556: Vox Patris caelestis (for SATTBB with divisions)

=== Evening canticle ===
- Magnificat (for 10 voices)
