= Westron Wynde =

Early 16th-century song

Westron Wynde is an early 16th-century song whose tune was used as the basis (cantus firmus) of Masses by English composers John Taverner, Christopher Tye and John Sheppard. The tune first appears with words in a partbook of around 1530, catalogued by the British Library as Royal Appendix MS 58. Historians believe that the lyrics are a few hundred years older ('Middle English') and the words are a fragment of medieval poetry.

== Lyrics ==
The lyrics of the original, as transcribed by Charles Frey:

Westron wynde when wyll thow blow
the smalle rayne downe can Rayne
Cryst yf my love were in my Armys
And I yn my bed Agayne.

== Music ==
Recovering the original tune of Westron Wynde that was used in these Masses is not entirely straightforward. There is a version that uses the secular words, but with rather different notes:

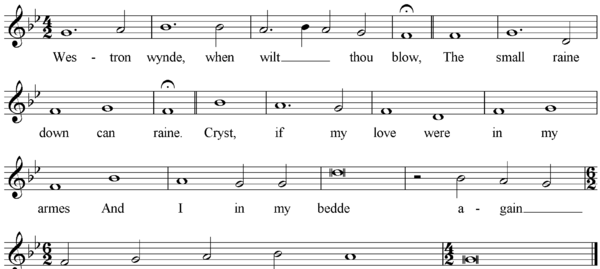
"Western Wind" secular lyric version

The version used by the three Mass composers can only be inferred by what they put into their Masses. In programme notes (see below), Peter Phillips offers the following reconstruction:

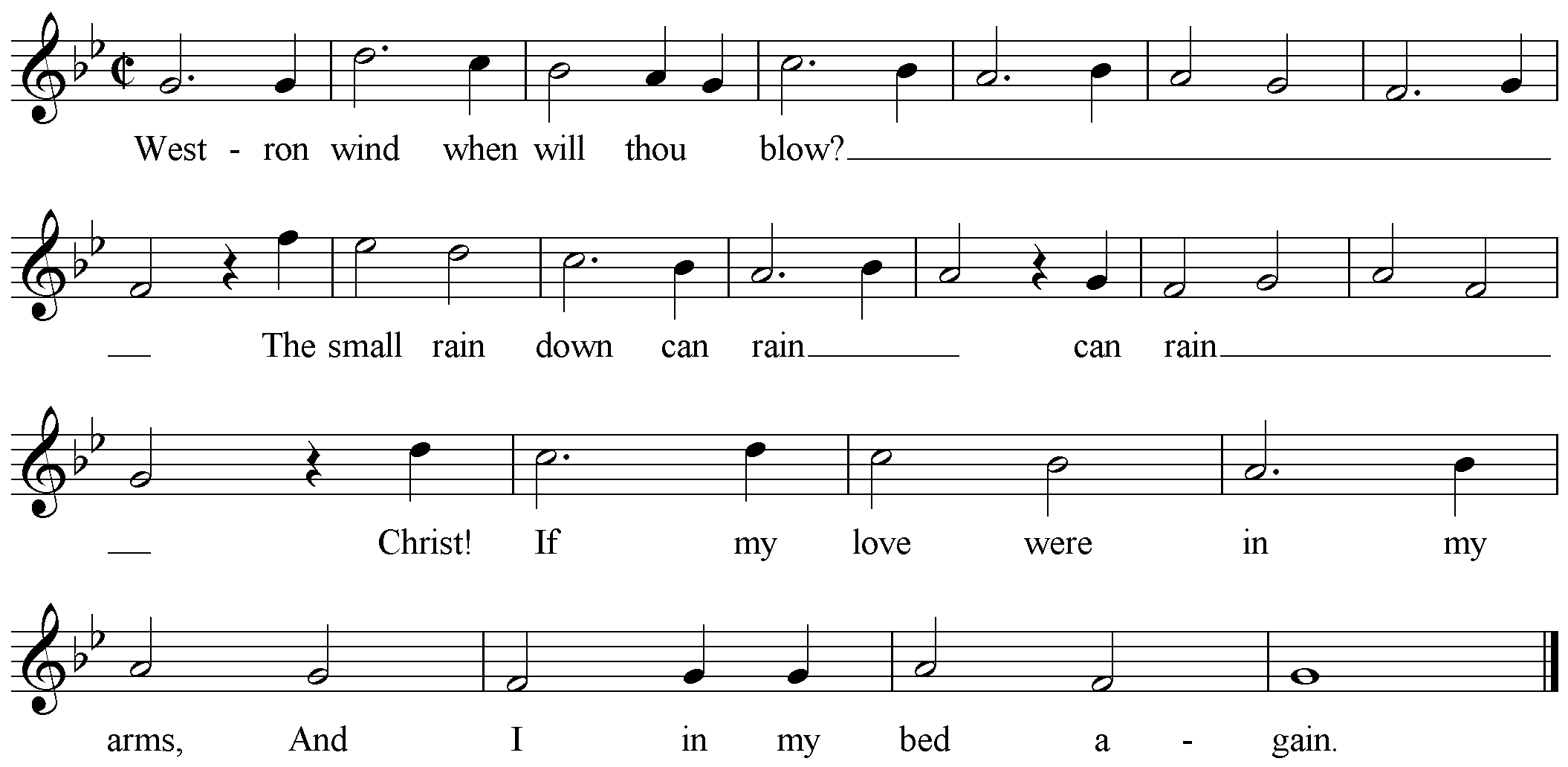
"Western Wind" Mass version

But this is not always exactly what appears in the Masses; thus the New Grove quotes the following sequence from Taverner's Mass:

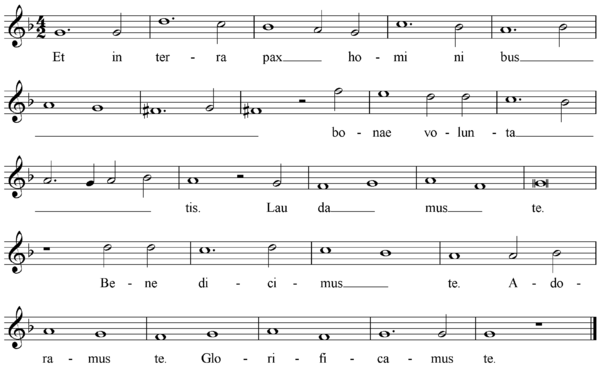
"Western Wind" Taverner's version

For the words being sung here, see Mass (music).

== Reworkings and Recordings ==
Westron Wynde was put to music by Igor Stravinsky as a movement (Westron Wind) of his Cantata (1952).

The American folk group The Limeliters (Louis Gottlieb, Alex Hassilev, and Glenn Yarbrough) recorded a version using a variation of the first tune above, with modern English stanzas interpolated. Both the variation and the interpolated stanzas were most likely written by the Limeliters themselves, one of whom (Gottlieb) was a musicologist and would have been familiar with the original song.

The British guitarist John Renbourn recorded his own arrangement of the tune for two guitars on his 1970 album The Lady and the Unicorn. The song has been recorded by Maddy Prior and Tim Hart on the album Summer Solstice and by Barbara Dickson on Full Circle.

The British band Current 93 recorded an extended and modified version of the song sometime between 1982 and 1995, adding various new lines. This version, however, was not released until 2010.

Saint Etienne recorded a version as Western Wind, as either side of the instrumental Tankerville on their 1994 album Tiger Bay with Stephen Duffy duetting in the refrain.

Susan McKeown & The Chanting House perform poet Robert Burns's version of the song entitled "Westlin Winds" on their 1996 album "Bones."

British composer Roger Jackson used the text and added a new verse in an entirely new setting in 2014.

"Eye of Heaven, pray gently smile,
And though the cold wind blow,
Soft, may you warm and mind my love
That I do love her so"

New Zealand composer Douglas Lilburn wrote a string quartet in 1939 entitled Phantasy based on a reworking of Westron Wynde. He undoubtedly modelled the work on his teacher Ralph Vaughan Williams' Fantasia on a Theme by Thomas Tallis (Lilburn was studying with Vaughan Williams at the time).

== Versions ==
Both simplified and distorted versions of this poem have been printed over the past many years. These include both tampered and accurately modernized versions. For example, William Chappell inserted 'O' at the start of the poem and replaced the word 'Cryst' with 'Oh' in his 1859 version. The latter was probably done to make it a safe reading for women and children in the 19th century context. He also included 'doth' between 'down' and 'rayne' based on his probable interpretation that the wind did blow the rain away. Some modernization of spellings was done by other editors to make the poem accessible for modern reading.

== In popular culture ==
The poem is used by:

- Ernest Hemingway in his novel A Farewell to Arms (1929).
- George Orwell in ch. 21 of his novel Burmese Days (1934).
- Virginia Woolf in her novel The Waves (1931).
- Wilbur Daniel Steele in his short story How Beautiful with Shoes.
- Madeleine L'Engle in her novel The Small Rain (1945).
- Louis Zukofsky includes the poem in A Test of Poetry (1948).
- Charles Olson quotes the poem in "Projective Verse" (1950).
- Thomas Pynchon for the title of his first published story, The Small Rain (1959).
- Ezra Pound includes the poem in Confucius to Cummings, edited with Marcella Spann (1964).
- George Oppen alludes to the poem in "O Western Wind" (1962),"The Little Pin: Fragment" (1975) and "Disasters" (1976).
- Walter Tevis in his novel Mockingbird (1980).
- Marta Randall in her book Dangerous Games (1980).
- The character Thierry (Judge Reinhold) in the 1991 thriller Zandalee.
- Robert Stone (novelist) in Outerbridge Reach (1992)
- The character Mary Boleyn (Scarlett Johansson) in the 2008 film The Other Boleyn Girl.
- Barbelle (Web Series) fictitious band from the web series of the same name in the song Clear Cut (2017).
- Clive James in The Fire of Joy: Roughly Eighty Poems to Get by Heart and Say Aloud (2020)
- Garth Greenwell in his novel Small Rain (2024).

== Sources ==
- Peter Phillips's reconstruction is taken from his programme notes for his recording Western Wind Masses: Taverner, Tye Sheppard, released 1993 on compact disc by Gimell Records, 454 927–2.
- The remaining musical examples above are adapted from versions given in the online version (2004) of the New Grove Dictionary of Music and Musicians.
