= Nicholas Ludford =

English composer

Nicholas Ludford (c. 1485 – 1557) was an English composer of the Tudor period. He is known for his festal masses, which are preserved in two early-16th-century choirbooks, the Caius Choirbook at Caius College, Cambridge, and the Lambeth Choirbook at Lambeth Palace, London. His surviving antiphons, all incomplete, are copied in the Peterhouse partbooks (Henrican set), which disappeared from view until some were rediscovered in 1850, and the rest only in 1926.

Ludford is well known as being the composer of the only surviving cycle of Lady Masses, small-scale settings of the Ordinary and Propers in three parts to be sung in the smaller chapels of religious institutions on each day of the week. Ludford's composing career, which appears to have ended in 1535, is seen as bridging the gap between the music of Robert Fayrfax (1465–1521) and that of John Taverner (1490–1545). Music scholar David Skinner has called Ludford "one of the last unsung geniuses of Tudor polyphony". In his Oxford History of English Music, John Caldwell observes of Ludford's six-part Mass and Magnificat Benedicta that it "is more a matter of astonishment that such mastery should be displayed by a composer of whom virtually nothing was known until modern times".

== Life ==
Not much about Ludford is known compared to his contemporaries Robert Fayrfax and John Taverner, but we can trace his life through the few mentions we have of him from the accounts of St Stephen's Chapel and St Margaret's Church Westminster. The first reference we have is in 1517 when he took up tenancy of lodgings on King Street, belonging to Westminster Abbey. This might suggest that he undertook singing work in the Abbey's Lady Mass choir or at the Parish Church of St Margaret's, which Ludford was to have a deep connection with throughout his life. There are no records of Ludford being employed at any of the prestigious household or chapel choirs in London so charting his early career is a matter of speculation.

In 1521 Ludford joined the Fraternity of St Nicholas as a 'clericus', a guild of musicians the membership of which was an essential step in the life of a London musician. This allows us to estimate that Ludford was born sometime in 1485. In 1522 he left his lodgings on King Street and took up accommodation elsewhere. This may be because he left his work at Westminster Abbey and started working at the collegiate chapel of St Stephen's, Westminster (or to give it its full title, the Royal Free Chapel of the Blessed Virgin Mary and St Stephen the Protomartyr). Ludford's employment here is recorded in the accounts drawn up at the dissolution of the Chapel in 1547 which records Ludford as starting work as 'verger' on 30 September 1527. This title does not signify that Ludford was merely a caretaker of the accoutrements of worship; the term had taken on a different meaning by about 1460, when, as Roger Bowers notes, the twin foundations of St Stephen's and St George's, Windsor decided to employ a high class musician full time. The post of verger was given to the well-established John Bedyngham and John Plummer at Westminster and Windsor respectively. Meanwhile, the actual duties of the verger were transferred to the 'subsexton'. At this time Ludford was also a regular parishioner at St Margaret's, Westminster, as witness his paying 3s 4d in 1525 'for his parte of a pewe'.

Ludford's employment at St Stephen's is described as 'manifold services in the skill of singing and organ playing'. As Nicholas Sandon has suggested, such a post would have probably been preceded by a term of probation, given the high standard of music making in what was an 'immensely prestigious collegiate church' (Bowers). This means he could have been employed as a singer from as early as 1524 and been deemed fit to run the music-making of the chapel in 1527. He was not the choir master, however, and it is more likely he played the organ for the alternatim Lady Masses and sung for Festal Masses when required.

Ludford's work seems to have extended outside St Stephen's in this period. In 1533 he was paid by St Margaret's for a choirbook, probably containing his own compositions and those by a composer he much admired, Robert Fayrfax. There were about six choirbooks in use around Westminster in this period and it has even been suggested by David Skinner that Ludford may have been partly responsible for the creation of the Caius Choirbook, which contains five Magnificats and ten Masses.

More of Ludford's involvement with St Margaret's is documented in the church warden accounts, which Ludford witnessed in 1537, 1542, 1547, 1549, 1551 and 1556. From 1552 to 1554 he was church warden himself, and as such he would have been responsible for overseeing the restoration of Catholic rites at the church under Mary I. St Margaret's was obviously his principal focus after the dissolution of St Stephen's in 1547 (the employees were only pensioned off in 1549, Ludford receiving £12, equivalent to his annual salary). While this was part of the widespread closure of collegiate foundations in the reign of Edward VI, it has been suggested that a particular motive in this case may possibly have been resistance at St Stephen's to the teaching of new Protestant ideas.

Ludford had two wives, the first of which he had married by 1543 according to Skinner. She must have died because he married Helen (or Elen) Thomas in St Margaret's in 1554. This suggests he was in good health and even in his will three months before his death (4 May) he is described not only as 'perfyght in remembraunce' (undoubtedly a legal requirement) but also as 'hole in bodye'. 'Nycolace Ludfoorthe of age' died and was buried on 9 August 1557 in St Margaret's Church. Skinner has suggested that as the will seems to have been finished with urgency, the influenza epidemic that was sweeping England might have been the final blow for the aged composer.

== Music ==
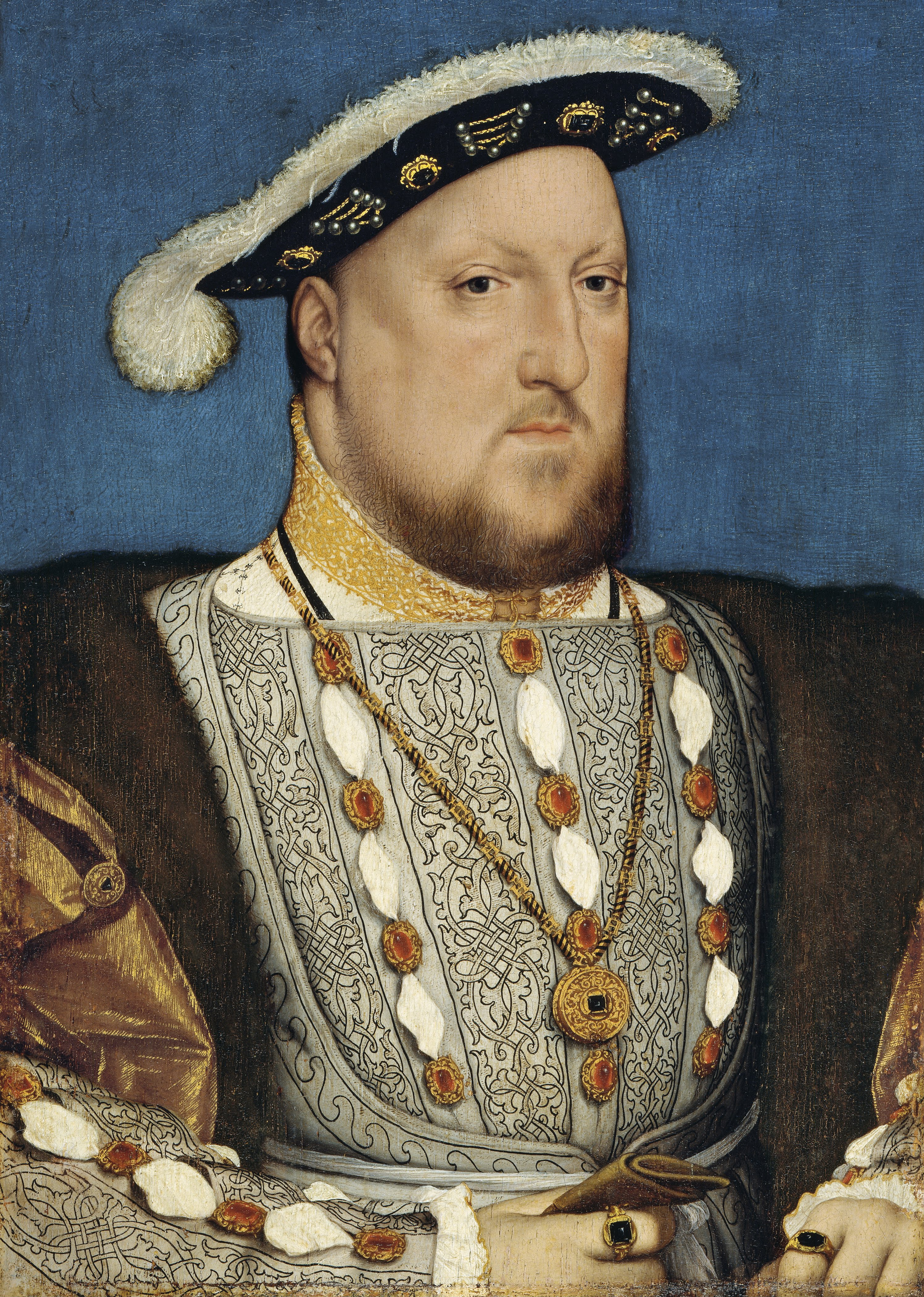
Henry VIII owned copies of Ludford's Lady Masses, but Ludford never wrote in the new styles demanded by England's Protestant reformation.

Unlike some composers of the period, such as Thomas Tallis (c. 1505–1585) and John Sheppard (c. 1513–1558), Ludford does not seem to have adapted his style to the demands of the English Reformation, and no compositions are recorded under his name after about 1535. This could be due to his devout Catholic faith which might have made it unacceptable to him to tone down his high polyphonic style. It might perhaps also have a more technical aspect, namely, that Ludford belonged to a generation awkwardly placed: too young to have died, like Fayrfax, before the religious turmoil, but too old to have been able to adopt and learn new styles like his younger contemporaries Tallis and Taverner.

Ludford's musical style is notable for the abundance of melody and for the imaginative use of vocal texture. Like John Taverner, Ludford sought an effect of exuberance and grandeur, and his work has been described as containing "florid detail". In the view of John Caldwell, though Ludford's music is less versatile than Taverner's, it is more experimental. Caldwell regards Ludford as the equal of Taverner in contrapuntal skill and in sensitivity to the human voice.

Ludford wrote 17 known Masses, a greater number than any other English composer of the time. Three of these are now lost and three survive only in fragments. All Ludford's Masses begin with a "head-motive", a similar passage at the beginning of each section. His cycle of seven three-part Lady Masses (Masses sung in honour of the Virgin Mary) is unique. These masses were part of a manuscript collection that once belonged to Henry VIII and his Catholic queen, Catherine of Aragon. The Lady Masses were presumably written to be sung daily at St Stephen's.

The few contemporary references to Ludford suggest that he was a private and highly religious man. He was not renowned in his own day, and his work cannot be identified with any of the major events of the time. In 1597, the Elizabethan composer Thomas Morley (c. 1557–1602), in his Introduction to Practicall Music, noted Ludford as an "authority"; but in the 17th century Ludford's music was neglected and finally forgotten. In 1913, scholar H B. Collins drew attention to Ludford, whose unpublished masses were then being sung by the choir of Westminster Cathedral under Sir Richard Terry. In the 1960s and 1970s, scholar John Bergsagel published Ludford's complete Masses and wrote commentaries on his work. The first recordings of Ludford's works, in editions by David Skinner, were made in 1993–95 by The Cardinall's Musick under Andrew Carwood. Significant recorded additions since include the Gramophone-award-winning disc by New College Choir, Oxford, which includes the Missa Benedicta and the votive antiphons Ave Cuius Conceptio and Domine Jesu Christe. This is the only recording to feature trebles and is a wonderful recreation of how Ludford's music might have sounded.

== List of musical works ==
http://www1.cpdl.org/wiki/index.php/Nicholas_Ludford
