= John Blitheman =

English composer and organist

John Blitheman (Blithman, Blytheman, Blythman, c. 1525 – 23 May 1591) was an English composer and organist.

== Life ==
The Fitzwilliam Virginal Book, which includes the third of his Gloria tibi Trinitas settings, gives his forename as William. However, Chapel Royal records from 1558 to 1590 consistently refer to John Blitheman, and there can be little doubt that this was the composer's name.

Nothing is known about his early life. In 1555 he was chaplain at Christ Church, Oxford, becoming master of the choristers there in 1564. From 1585 until his death he was appointed organist of the Chapel Royal (succeeding Thomas Tallis), where John Bull was both his pupil and successor. He died in London in 1591 and is buried at St Nicholas Olave, Queenhithe.

The great majority of Blitheman's extant works is included in The Mulliner Book, where he is represented by fifteen pieces. One of his In nomines, dating from before 1591, displays the earliest known example of triplet figuration in English keyboard music.
