= Simon Ludford =

English physician

- Died: 1574
- Occupation: Physician

Simon Ludford (died 1574) was an English physician.

== Biography ==
Ludford was a native of Bedfordshire, and entered the Franciscan order. After the dissolution of the monasteries he became an apothecary in London, and supplicated for the degree of B.M. from the university of Oxford on 6 November 1553. He was admitted to the degree and to practice on 27 November 1554 (Oxf. Univ. Reg., Oxf. Hist. Soc., i. 222), but the College of Physicians of London informed the university of his incompetence in medicine, and he was excluded from the privileges of his degree. He went to Cambridge, but met with no better fate. The vigilant Dr. John Caius caused a letter to be sent to the authorities stating that Ludford had been examined by the College of Physicians on 12 February 1553, and found ignorant, not only of medicine but of philosophy and letters, and that he was without any trace of a liberal education. These rebuffs seem to have stimulated him to study, and he was admitted M.D. at Oxford on 26 June 1560. On 7 April 1563 he was elected a fellow of the College of Physicians of London, and he was chosen a censor in 1564, 1569, and 1572. His copy of the works of Avicenna is in the library of the college with some others of his books. His only extant composition is a manuscript copy of verses written on a blank space at the end of the preface of Charles Estienne's ‘De dissectione partium corporis humani libri tres,’ Paris, 1545, and descriptive of the book. Ludford had paid 8s. for the book, and states he was in want of money at the time. He died in 1574.
