= John Mundy (composer) =

John Mundy (or Munday)
- Born: Between 1550 and 1554
- Died: 29 June 1630, (aged 76–80) Windsor, England
- Genres: Renaissance music
- Occupations: Composer, organist and virginalist
- Years active: Late 16th century to early 17th century

John Mundy (or Munday) (before 1555 – 29 June 1630) was an English composer, virginalist and organist of the Renaissance period.

== Life and works ==
The son and pupil of the eminent composer William Mundy, he was organist at Eton, and succeeded John Marbeck after his death in 1585 as organist at St George's Chapel, Windsor. He received a bachelor of music degree from the University of Oxford in 1586, and his doctorate in 1624. In 1585 he was appointed joint organist of Westminster Abbey with Nathaniel Giles, a post he maintained until his death in 1630.

Mundy was one of the earliest English madrigalists. He published a volume of Songs and Psalms in 1594, and contributed a madrigal, Lightly she whipped o'er the dales, to The Triumphs of Oriana (1601), a compilation of madrigals by Thomas Morley in honour of Queen Elizabeth I. He composed sacred music in English and Latin, including music for the Book of Common Prayer, and is represented in the Fitzwilliam Virginal Book by five pieces, including a magnificent set of variations on the popular song Goe from my window and a whimsical but fine miniature, Munday's Joy. He also wrote a setting of the recusant Chidiock Tichborne's poem My prime of youth before the latter's gruesome execution in 1586 for his part in the Babington Plot.

Mundy died on 29 June 1630 at Windsor, succeeded in his post there by his colleague Nathaniel Giles.

== Compositions ==
Songs and Psalmes (pub. 1594)

- For 3 voices
  - 1. Praise the Lord, O my soul
  - 2. Save me, O God
  - 3. O all ye nations of the Lord
  - 4. Blessed art thou that fearest God (1st part)
  - 5. Thus art thou blest that fearest God (2nd part)
  - 6. Hear my prayer, O Lord
  - 7. Ye people all in one accord
  - 8. O Lord, turn not away thy face
  - 9. O come, let us lift up our voice
  - 10. Of all the birds that I have heard
  - 11. As I went a walking in the month of May
  - 12. Turn about and see me
- For 4 voices
  - 13. Lord, to thee I make my moan
  - 14. O Lord, of whom I do depend
  - 15. Sing ye unto the Lord our God
  - 16. I lift my heart to thee
  - 17. My prime of youth
  - 18. In deep distress
  - 19. The longer that I live
  - 20. The shepherd Strephon (1st part)
  - 21. Witness, ye heavens (2nd part)
  - 22. Heigh ho! I’ll go to plough no more
- For 5 voices
  - 23. Lord, arise and help thy servant
  - 24. Have mercy on me, O Lord
  - 25. Unto thee lift I up mine eyes
  - 26. Were I a king
  - 27. In midst of woods (1st part)
  - 28. The blackbird (2nd part)
  - 29. Penelope that longed for the night
  - 30. Who loves a life
- Lightly she whipped o'er the dales, madrigal, in 5 parts [pub. in The Triumphs of Oriana, 1601]

Sacred vocal music

- Aedes nostra sancta, motet
- Ah helpless wretch, anthem
- Blessed be the Lord, sacred song, in 5 parts [possibly by William Mundy]
- Blessed is God in all His gifts, anthem, in 7 parts
- De Lamentatione, sacred motet
- Dominus illuminatio mea, motet, in 3 parts
- Dum transisset sabbatum, sacred responsory
- Give laud unto the Lord, anthem, in 7 parts
- In te Domine speravi, sacred motet
- Judica me Deus, sacred motet
- Kyrie 'lux et origo'
- Let us now laud and magnify with music, anthem, in 4 parts
- O give thanks unto the Lord for he is gracious, anthem, for 4, 5, or 7 parts
- O God my strength and fortitude, anthem
- O Lord, our governor, anthem, for 5 or 8 parts
- Send aid and save me, anthem
- Sicut erat, [motet], in 3 parts
- Sing joyfully unto God our strength, anthem, in 5 parts
- Thou hast make him lower

Instrumental music

for keyboard

- Fantasia [#II in Fitzwilliam Virginal Book]
- Fantasia, Faire Wether, etc. [#III in Fitzwilliam Virginal Book]
- Robin [#XV in Fitzwilliam Virginal Book]
- Goe from my Window [#XLII in Fitzwilliam Virginal Book]
- Munday's Joy [#CCLXXXII in Fitzwilliam Virginal Book]

for instrumental consort

- Judica me deus, motet without words, in 6 parts, for viols
- In nōie, in 6 parts
- In nōie, in 5 parts
- [In nomine], in 6 parts [unnamed in original manuscript]
- In nōie, in 5 parts
