= In Nomine =

Title given to a large number of mucial pieces

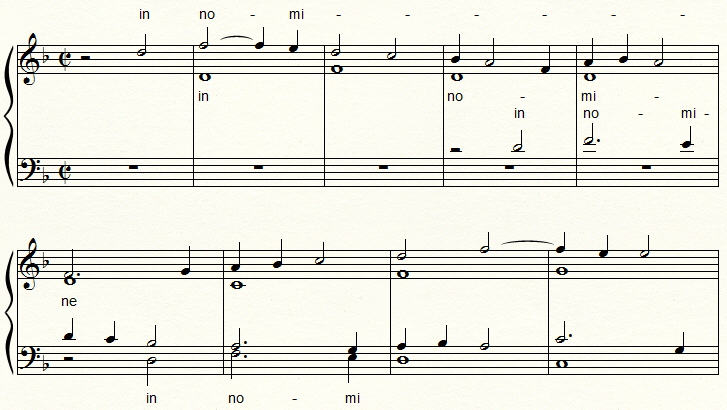
Opening of the "in nomine" passage from Taverner's Gloria Tibi Trinitas Mass

In Nomine is a title given to a large number of pieces of English polyphony, predominantly instrumental music, first composed during the 16th century.

== History ==
John Bull (ca.1562-1628) In Nomine à3
The In Nomine theme is the highest part, above two other voices that alternate between polyphonic and homophonic textures (MIDI rendition)

Orlando Gibbons (bap.1583-1625) In Nomine à5
Five-part In Nomine, probably written for viols but represented here with organ voices (MIDI rendition)

Elway Bevin (ca.1554-1638) - In Nomine à5, No.2 (ca.1610)

William Byrd (ca.1540-1623) - In Nomine à4, VdGS No.2, Oxford. Bodleian Library, Mus.Sch.d.212-6 (ca.1610)

Orlando Gibbons (bap.1583-1625) - In Nomine à4 (ca.1610)

Robert_Parsons (ca.1535-1572) - In Nomine à7, No.2, London. GB-Lbl, Add.Ms.31390 (ca.1578)

Picforth (fl.1580s) - In Nomine à5 (ca.1578)

Poynt (fl.1570s) - In Nomine à5 (ca.1578)

Henry Purcell (1659-1695) - In Nomine à6, Z.746 (1680)

Henry Purcell (1659-1695) - In Nomine à7, Z.747 (1680)

John Taverner (ca.1490-1545) - In Nomine à4 from the Missa Gloria Tibi Trinitas, The Baldwin Partbooks (ca.1570)

John Taverner (ca.1490-1545) - In Nomine à5 (5th part by anonymous composer) from the Missa Gloria Tibi Trinitas (ca.1578)
All performed by Phillip W. Serna, treble, tenor & bass viols with violone

This "most conspicuous single form in the early development of English consort music" originated in the early 16th century from a six-voice mass composed before 1530 by John Taverner on the plainchant Gloria Tibi Trinitas. In the Benedictus section of this mass, the Latin phrase "in nomine Domini" was sung in a reduced, four-part counterpoint, with the plainchant melody in the meane part. At an early point, this attractive passage became popular as a short instrumental piece, though there is no evidence that Taverner himself was responsible for any of these arrangements. Over the next 150 years, English composers worked this melody into "In Nomine" pieces of ever greater stylistic range.

In Nomines are typically consort pieces for four or five instruments, especially consorts of viols. One instrument plays the theme through as a cantus firmus with each note lasting one or even two measures; usually this is the second part from the top. The other parts play more complex lines, often in imitative counterpoint. Usually they take up several new motifs in turn, using each one as a point of imitation. However, there are In Nomines composed for solo or duo keyboard instruments and even one for the lute: a fantasy titled Farewell by John Dowland.

Examples of the genre include compositions by Christopher Tye (the most prolific composer of In Nomines, with 24 surviving settings), Thomas Tallis, William Byrd, John Bull, Orlando Gibbons, Thomas Tomkins, William Lawes, and Henry Purcell, among many others. They can vary in mood from melancholy to serene, exultant, or even playful or hectic (as in Tye's In Nomine "Crye", in which the viols seem to imitate the call of a street hawker).

Composition of In Nomines lapsed in the eighteenth century but was revived in the twentieth century, an early notable example being Richard Strauss's opera Die schweigsame Frau, which quotes a keyboard In nomine by John Bull. Later examples are found in works by Peter Maxwell Davies and Roger Smalley. Starting in 1999, the Freiburg new-music organization ensemble recherche began commissioning an ongoing series of short In Nomine compositions for the festival Wittener Tage für neue Kammermusik. The series is dedicated to Harry Vogt, director of the festival since 1989, and is collectively titled the Witten In Nomine Broken Consort Book. Some of the notable composers who have contributed pieces to this series to date include Brian Ferneyhough, Georg Friedrich Haas, Toshio Hosokawa, György Kurtág, Claus-Steffen Mahnkopf, Gérard Pesson, Robert H.P. Platz, Rolf Riehm, Wolfgang Rihm, Salvatore Sciarrino, Hans Zender, and Walter Zimmermann. In 1995, for the 300th anniversary of the death of Purcell, Gavin Bryars composed In Nomine (after Purcell) for the viol consort Fretwork. Graham Waterhouse composed In Nomine for cello solo in 2013.
