= Meane =

Voice type used in early English choral music

Meane (sometimes spelled mean) is a vocal music term used by English composers of polyphonic choral music during the English pre-Reformation and Reformation eras. At this time choral music written for the Church of England was often voiced in 5 parts, with MAATB (Meane, Alto, Alto, Tenor, Bass) or TrMATB (Treble, Meane, Alto, Tenor, Bass) being frequent voicings utilized by William Byrd, Thomas Tallis and their contemporaries. The meane part was typically sung by boys whose voices were not as high as a treble or boy soprano but were not as low as a countertenor, i. e. Boy alto. Occasionally the meane line would be sung by a combination of treble and countertenor voices.
