= Thomas Appleby (composer) =

Thomas Appleby (c. 1488 – 1563) was Informator Choristarum at Magdalen College, Oxford from 1539 until 1541, where he was succeeded by John Sheppard. Appleby was also the organist and instructor of the choristers at Lincoln Cathedral from 1538 to 1539 and from 1541 to 1562.

== Sources ==
- Free scores by Thomas Appleby (composer) in the Choral Public Domain Library (ChoralWiki)
