= Treble voice =

Voice which takes the treble part in choral music

A treble voice is a voice which takes the treble part. In the absence of a separate descant part, this is normally the highest-pitched part, and otherwise the second highest. The term is most often used today within the context of choral music in reference to youthful singers. The American Choral Directors Association defines a treble as "a singer, both male and female, ages eight to sixteen".

While the term treble is gender neutral, the term is widely used in place of the term boy soprano within the United Kingdom. The term became widely used by English composers of polyphonic choral music during the English pre-Reformation and Reformation eras. At this time choral music written for the Church of England was often voiced in five parts with TrMATB (Treble, Meane, Alto, Tenor, Bass) being one of the most common voicings utilized by Thomas Tallis and his contemporaries.

In the Baroque era the term treble was used differently than it is today. The term was used in operas, cantatas, choral works, and other compositions to refer to three different kinds of singers: adult women, boy sopranos, and castrati. The term is still used by opera composers today when a role requires a child vocalist.

== See also ==
- Four-part harmony
- Part (music)
- Treble clef
- Sacred Harp
