= John Taverner =

English composer and organist

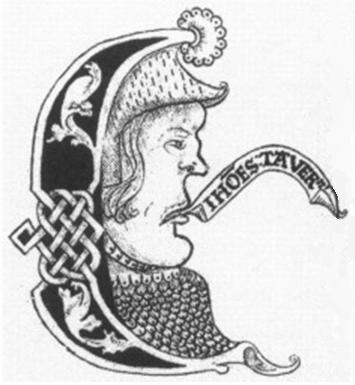
- A possible likeness of John Taverner in an ornamental capital E from the Forrest-Heyther partbooks, c. 1520, shown with speech scroll inscribed in Latin: Joh(ann)es Tavern(er)
- Born: c. 1490
- Died: 18 October 1545 (aged 54–55)
- Era: Renaissance music

John Taverner (c. 1490 – 18 October 1545) was an English composer and organist, regarded as one of the most important English composers of his era. He is best-known for Missa Gloria tibi Trinitas and The Western Wynde Mass, and Missa Corona Spinea is also often viewed as a masterwork.

== Career ==
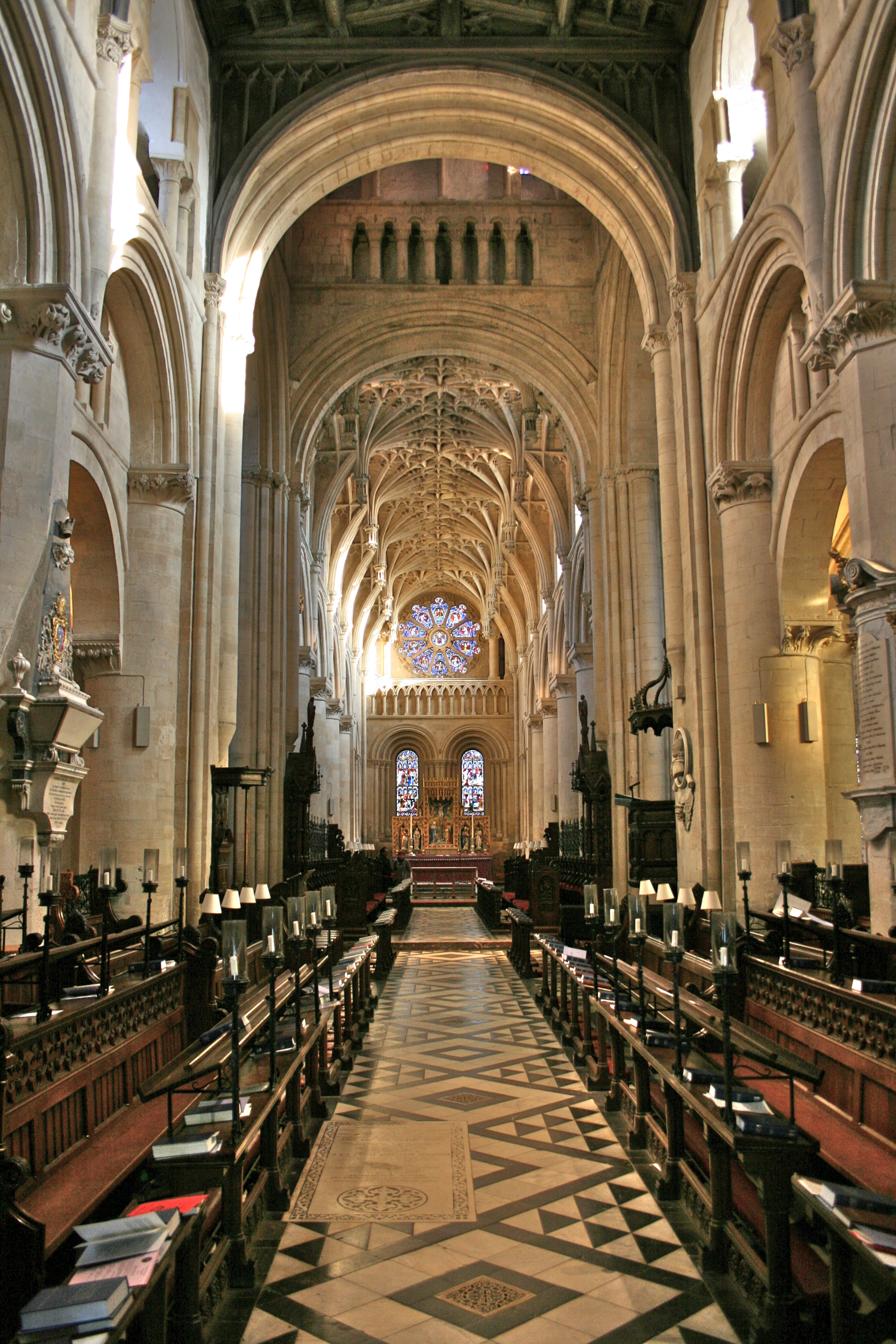
Interior of Christ Church Cathedral, Oxford.

Nothing is known of Taverner's activities before 1524. He appears to have come from the East Midlands, possibly being born in Tattershall, Lincolnshire, but there is no indication of his parentage. According to one of his own letters, he was related to the Yerburghs, a well-to-do Lincolnshire family. The earliest information is that in 1524, Taverner travelled from Tattershall to the Church of St Botolph in nearby Boston, as a guest singer. Two years later, in 1526, Taverner became the first Organist and Master of the Choristers at Christ Church, Oxford, appointed by Cardinal Thomas Wolsey. The college had been founded in 1525, by Cardinal Wolsey, and was then known as Cardinal College. Immediately before this, Taverner had been a clerk fellow at the Collegiate Church of Tattershall. In 1528, he was reprimanded for his (probably minor) involvement with Lutherans, but escaped punishment for being "but a musitian". Wolsey fell from favour in 1529, and in 1530, Taverner left the college. He married a widow, one Rose Parrowe, probably in 1536, and she outlived him until 1553. During the last five months of the composer's life, he was an alderman in the town council of Boston. For about three years, previously, he was the treasurer of the Corpus Christi Gild, there in Boston.

As far as can be told, Taverner had no further musical appointments, nor can any of his known works be dated to after that time, so he may have ceased composition. It is often said that after leaving Oxford, Taverner worked as an agent of Thomas Cromwell assisting in the dissolution of the monasteries, although the veracity of this is now thought to be highly questionable. He is known to have settled eventually in Boston, Lincolnshire, where he was a small landowner and reasonably well-off. He is buried with his wife under the belltower at Boston Parish Church. (In the few existing copies of his signature, the composer actually spelled his last name "Tavernor".) The 20th-century composer, Sir John Tavener claimed (even in his early teens) to be his direct descendant.

== Works ==
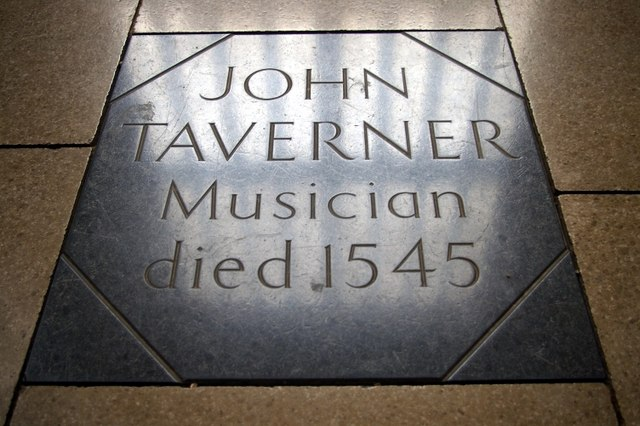
Grave in St Botolph's, Boston

In Nomine à4 from the Missa Gloria Tibi Trinitas, The Baldwin Partbooks, Oxford. Christ Church, Mss.979-83 (ca.1570)

In Nomine à5 (5th part by Anonymous Composer) from the Missa Gloria Tibi Trinitas, London. GB-Lbl, Add.Ms.31390 (ca.1578)
Performed by Phillip W. Serna, Treble, Tenor & Bass Viols

Most of Taverner's music is vocal, and includes masses, Magnificats and motets. The bulk of his output is thought to date from the 1520s. His best-known motet is Dum Transisset Sabbatum.

One of his best-known masses is based on a popular song called The Western Wynde (John Sheppard and Christopher Tye later also wrote masses based on this same song). Taverner's Western Wynde mass is unusual for the period because the theme tune appears in each of the four parts, excepting the alto, at different times. Perhaps his most celebrated work is his Missa Gloria tibi Trinitas, which Taverner probably composed during his years at Christ Church, Oxford. Commonly his masses are designed so that each of the four sections (Gloria, Credo, Sanctus-Benedictus and Agnus Dei) are about the same length, often achieved by putting the same number of repetitions of the thematic material in each. For example, in the Western Wynde mass, the theme is repeated nine times in each section. As the sections have texts of very different lengths, he uses extended melismata in the movements with fewer words.

Several of his other masses use the widespread cantus firmus technique, where a plainchant melody with long note values is placed in an interior part, often the tenor. Examples of cantus firmus masses include Corona Spinea and Gloria Tibi Trinitas. Another technique of composition is seen in his mass Mater Christi, which is based upon material taken from his motet of that name, and hence known as a "derived" or "parody" mass.

The Missa Gloria tibi Trinitas gave origin to the style of instrumental work known as an In nomine. Although this mass is in six parts, some more virtuosic sections are in reduced numbers of parts, presumably intended for soloists, a compositional technique used in several of his masses. The section at the words "in nomine ..." in the Benedictus is in four parts, with the plainchant in the alto. This section of the mass became popular as an instrumental work for viol consort. Other composers came to write instrumental works modelled on this, and the name In nomine was given to works of this type.

The life of Taverner was the subject of Taverner, an opera by Peter Maxwell Davies.

== List of works ==
=== Masses ===
1. Missa Gloria tibi Trinitas (6 voices) (This mass was probably composed for Trinity Sunday. The original manuscript of this work—in the form of partbooks—contains facial portraits of Taverner. The portraits are in the initial letters of these partbooks. The above portrait is one of them.)
2. Missa Corona Spinea (6 voices)
3. Missa O Michael (6 voices)
4. Missa Sancti Wilhelmi (5 voices), sometimes called Small Devotion (possibly a corruption of inscription "S Will Devotio" found in two sources)
5. Missa Mater Christi (5 voices)
6. The Mean Mass (5 voices)
7. The Plainsong Mass (4 voices)
8. The Western Wynde Mass (4 voices)

=== Mass fragments ===
1. Christeleison (3 voices)
2. Kyrie Le Roy (4 voices)

=== Votive antiphons ===
1. Ave Dei Patris filia (5 voices)
2. Gaude plurimum (5 voices)
3. O splendor gloriae (5 voices) (This motet may have been co-written with Christopher Tye.)
4. O Wilhelme, pastor bone (in honour of Cardinal Wolsey)

=== Office music ===
1. Alleluya. Veni electa (4 voices)
2. Alleluya (4 voices)
3. Te Deum (5 voices)

=== Motets ===
1. Audivi vocem de caelo (4 voices)
2. Ave Maria (5 voices)
3. Dum transisset sabbatum (I) (5 voices, only work by Taverner included in the Dow Partbooks; also a 4 voice edition)
4. Dum transisset sabbatum (II) (4 voices)
5. Ecce carissimi
6. Ex ejus tumba – Sospitati dedit aegro
7. Fac nobis secundum hoc nomen (5 voices)
8. Fecundata sine viro (3 voices)
9. Hodie nobis caelorum rex
10. In pace in idipsum (4 voices)
11. Jesu spes poenitentibus (3 voices)
12. Magnificat (4 voices)
13. Magnificat (5 voices)
14. Magnificat (6 voices)
15. Mater Christi (5 voices)
16. O Christe Jesu pastor bone (5 voices, and a contrafactum of the antiphon "O Wilhelme")
17. Prudens virgo (3 voices)
18. Sancte deus (5 voices)
19. Sub tuum presidium (5 voices)
20. Tam peccatum (3 voices)
21. Traditur militibus (3 voices)
22. Virgo pura (3 voices)

=== Other ===
1. In trouble and adversity (SATB, a contrafactum on his four-part instrumental consort piece In Nomine).

=== Secular works ===
1. In women (2 voices)
2. Quemadmodum (possibly for viols or recorders) (This piece is now believed to have been a motet, with a text taken from Psalm 42. In 2010, the Oxford University Press published a choral version of this work, in an edition made by Tim Symons.)
