= Christopher Tye =

English composer and organist (c. 1505–1570)

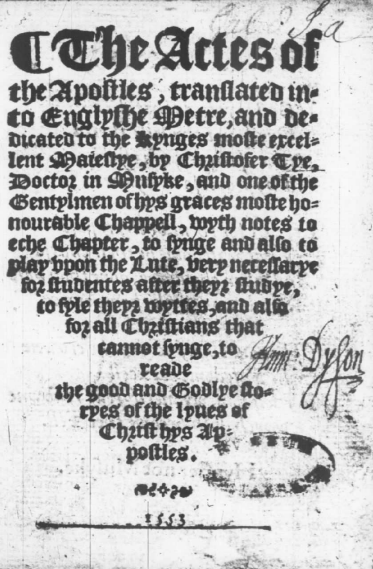
Frontispiece of Christopher Tye's only published work, the Actes of the Apostles of 1553

Christopher Tye (c. 1505 – before 1573) was an English Renaissance composer and organist. Probably born in Cambridgeshire, he trained at the University of Cambridge and became the master of the choir at Ely Cathedral. He is noted as the music teacher of Edward VI and was held in high esteem for his choral music, as well as chamber works such as his 24 polyphonic In nomines. It is likely that only a small percentage of his compositional output survives, often only as fragments; his Acts of the Apostles was the only work to be published in his lifetime.

He ceased composing when he was ordained, returning to Ely Cathedral and later becoming rector of Doddington, Cambridgeshire. Today, he is perhaps best known for the hymn "Winchester Old", based on a theme from Acts of the Apostles, which forms the basis of the most commonly performed version in the United Kingdom of "While Shepherds Watched Their Flocks".

== Beginnings ==
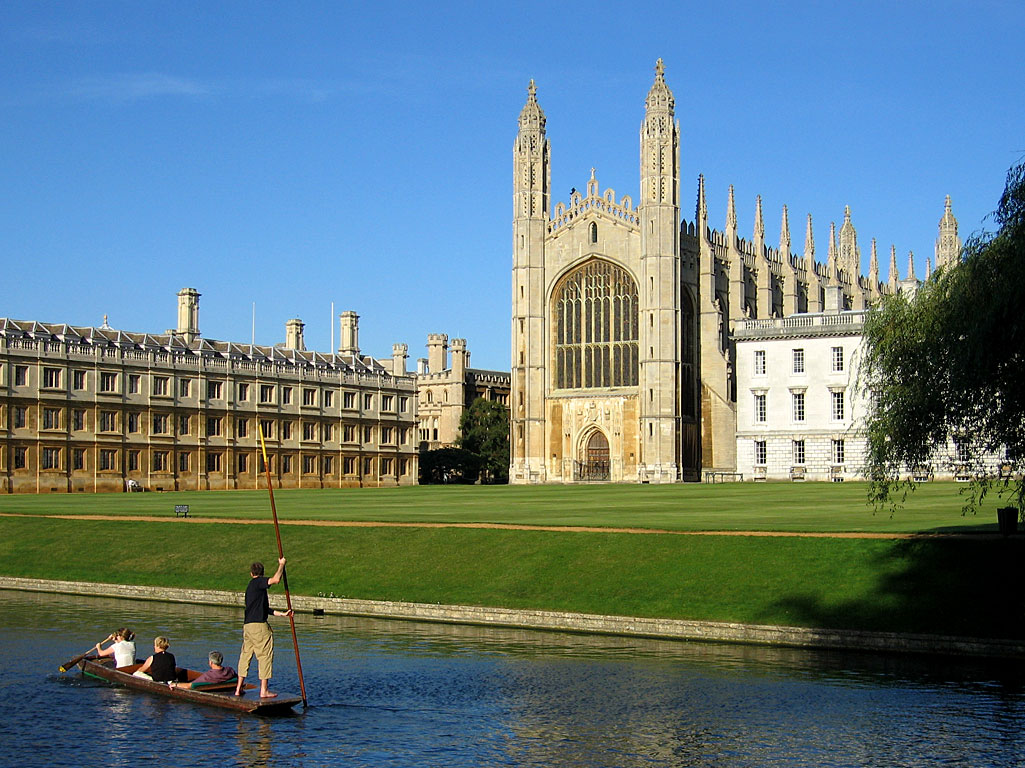
Tye may have been among the first singers in King's College Chapel, Cambridge.

Little is known about Tye's origins. Cambridge University records for the academic year 1536–37 indicate that he received the degree of Bachelor of Music after "a study of ten years in the musical art"; from this it is supposed that Tye was born around 1505 (making him a direct contemporary of Thomas Tallis), probably in Cambridgeshire, where the family name was common and where Tye would go on to spend much of his career. For two terms in 1537 Tye is recorded among the lay clerks of the Choir of King's College, Cambridge; it was in 1536–37 that the so called "temporary" chapel (in use since the 1440s) collapsed, so Tye may well have been part of the first generation of lay clerks to sing in regular worship in the iconic King's College Chapel known today.

By 1543 Tye had taken up the position of Magister Choristarum (choirmaster) at Ely Cathedral. In 1545 the University of Cambridge awarded him the degree of Doctor of Music, and three years later the same honour was bestowed on him by the University of Oxford.

== Work with the Royal Court ==
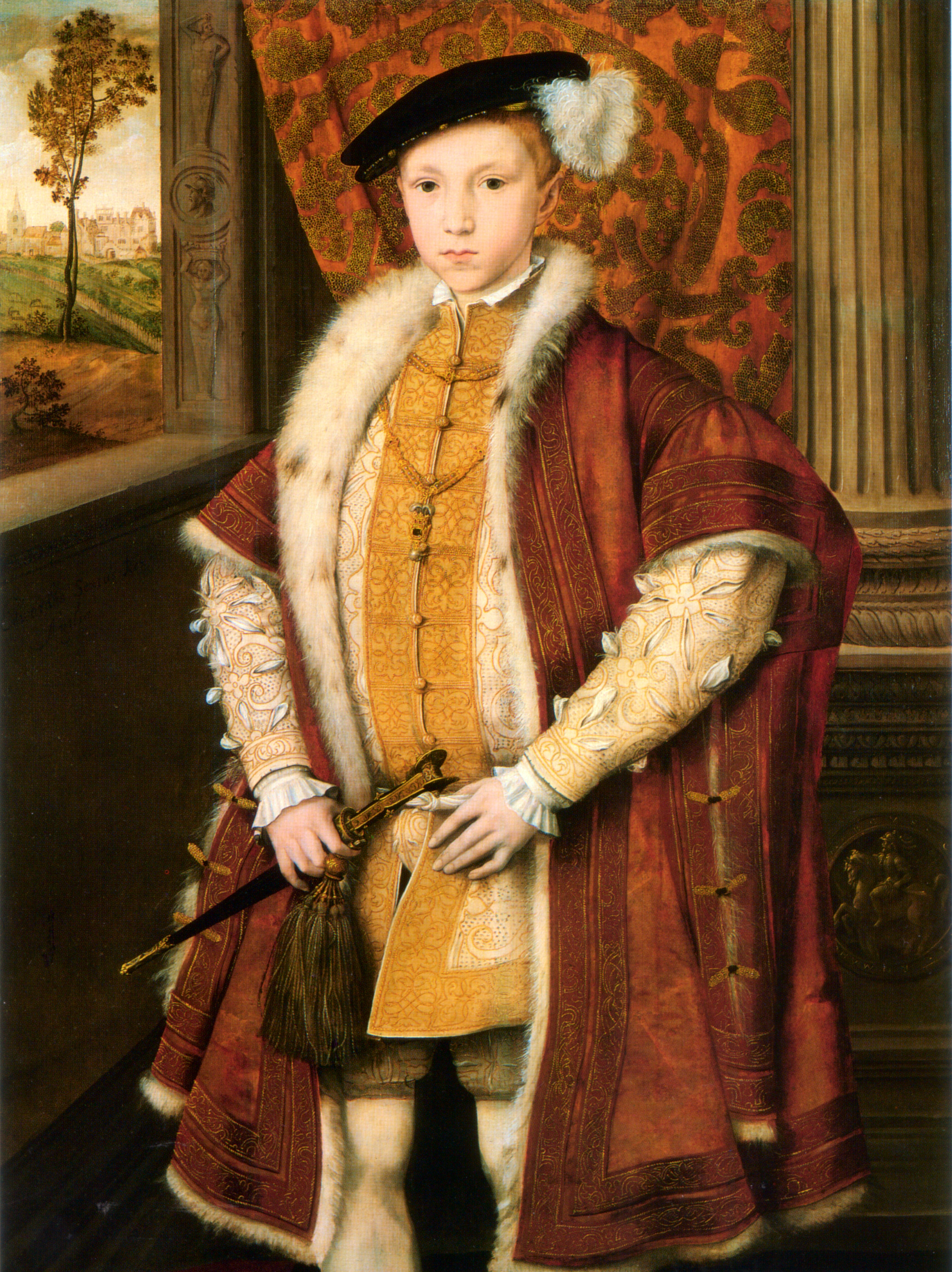
Edward VI as Prince of Wales, 1546

The composer's career shows that he had a strong connection to Richard Cox, who was a passionate church reformer and a tutor of King Edward (then Prince Edward). This affiliation would prove to have a strong influence on him for the rest of his life. Cox was also the person who very probably introduced Tye to the royal court. It is believed that this led to Christopher Tye being a kind of musical adviser of the court who worked closely with Edward. In 1605, Samuel Rowley (believed to be Tye's grandson) wrote a play entitled When You See Me You Know Me. In the play, Tye and King Edward play important roles and exchange dialogue where Edward identifies 'Doctor Tye' as 'Our music's lecturer.'

Later, in 1553, Tye published his rhymed scriptural paraphrase, The Actes of the Apostles. In it he takes the ideas set forth in the book of 'Acts' in the Bible and sets them to meter. Although it was met with divided reviews (even today), the work is hugely important because it is dedicated to Edward. In the preface he goes into some detail that implies a kind of friendship between the two. Although it is never mentioned explicitly, it is generally assumed that Tye held a position in the Chapel Royal staff during the 1550s at some point.

== Religious posts ==
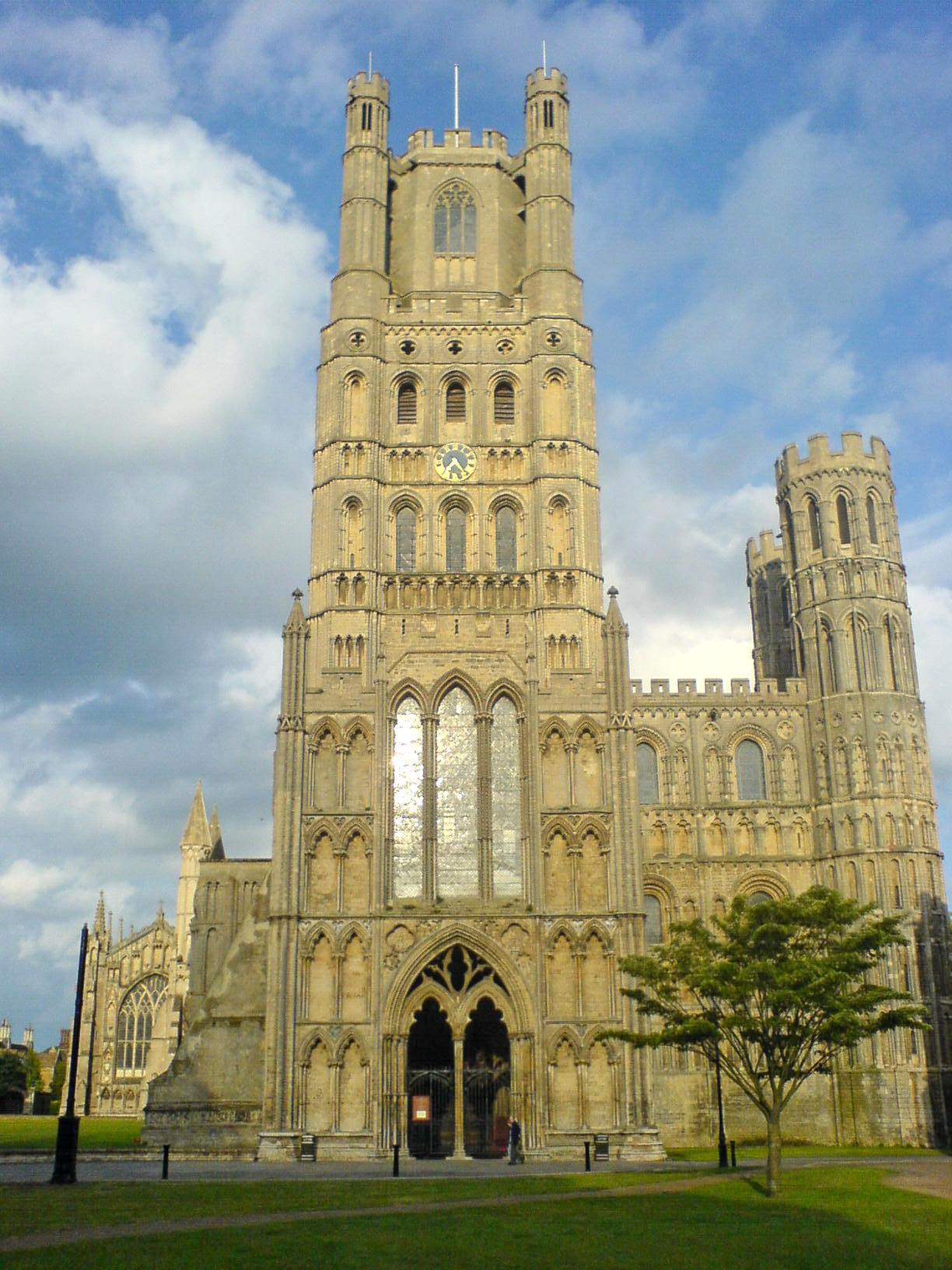
Ely Cathedral

In 1558, Tye took up his posting again at Ely Cathedral, probably at the request of his old friend, Richard Cox. Soon, thereafter, Tye took it upon himself to take up a place in the ministry and thus ceased to compose music. Cox, who was Bishop of Ely during this time, ordained the composer as deacon in 1560 and later in the year as priest. Tye resigned from the post at Ely and was appointed to Doddington, Cambridgeshire, the richest benefice in England.

Tye is believed to have died at Doddington before March 1573 when his successor as rector was appointed, although no record is found of his death.

== Works ==
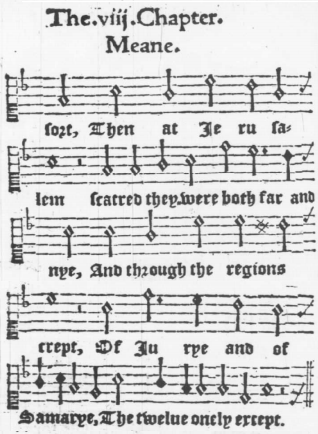
The "meane" of chapter VIII in Tye's Actes of the Apostles of 1553. The latter half was adapted and used as the tune of "Winchester Old", otherwise known as "While Shepherds Watched their Flocks by Night".

As a pre-eminent court musician with strong Protestant leanings, Tye is generally considered to be one of the most influential English composers of his day. Even after his appointment in the ministry when his composing ceased, his reputation as a musician continued to spread. However, only one of Tye's works, Actes of the Apostles of 1553, a verse translation of the Acts of the Apostles into four-part harmony, was published during his lifetime. Compared to his polyphonic works, this work is not well regarded, although it is from this collection that his most familiar piece is derived; the most common tune of "While Shepherds Watched Their Flocks".

His surviving Latin polyphonic choral works, most likely dating from the reign of Henry VIII include three full masses - the Peterhouse mass, a Westron Wynde mass and a six-voice Missa Euge bone. Other surviving movements from psalms include Quaesumus omnipotens et misericors Deus, Miserere mei, Deus, Omnes gentes, plaudite manibus, Peccavimus cum patribus nostris.

Some works only exist in parts or excerpts. For example, it was only after laboriously reconstructing a supposedly missing bass voice part of the anthem "To Father, Son and Holy Ghost" that the editor Vladimir Fedorov discovered the 'missing' part. Works such as O God, be merciful unto us have been revived.

His In Nomines and other instrumental for four or five works survive, some of the earliest examples of chamber music. Nigel Davison, writing in the Oxford Dictionary of National Biography suggests that given his reputation as an organist, it would be inconceivable that he composed no keyboard works, and concludes that these must have also been lost.

== See also ==
- Robert White (composer)
