= Early music of the British Isles =

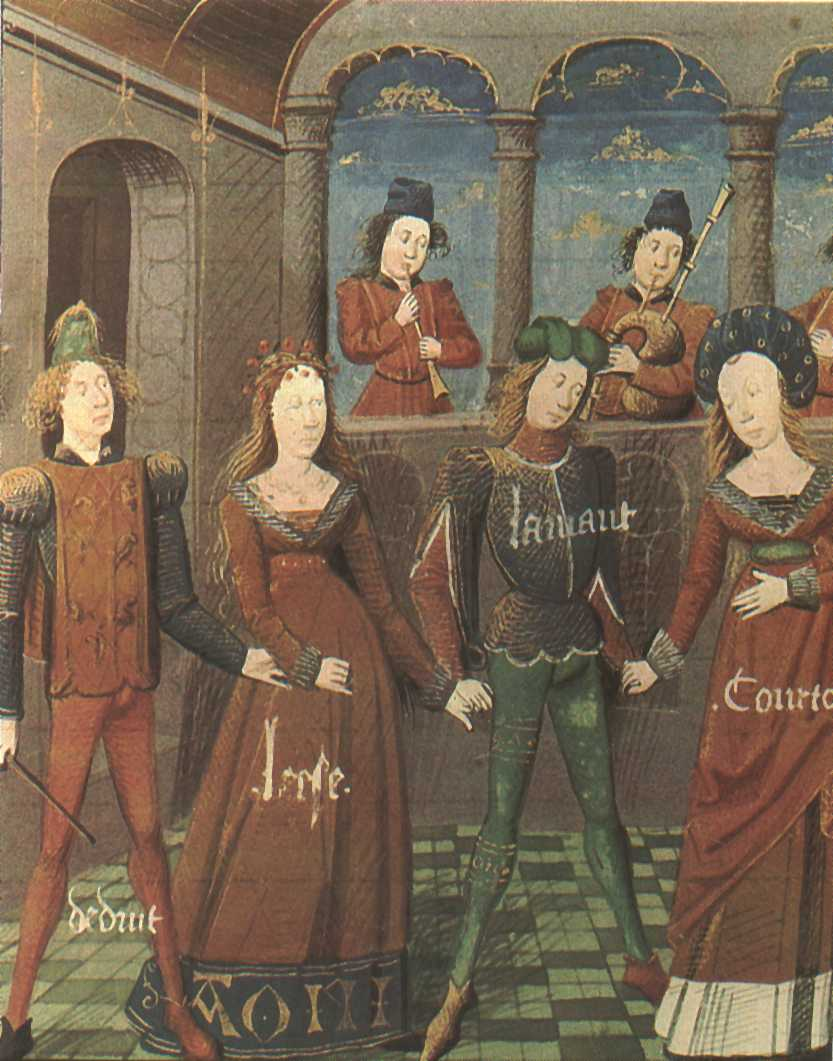
English Miniature from a manuscript of the Roman de la Rose

Early music of Britain and Ireland, from the earliest recorded times until the beginnings of the Baroque in the 17th century, was a diverse and rich culture, including sacred and secular music and ranging from the popular to the elite. Each of the major nations of England, Ireland, Scotland, and Wales retained unique forms of music and of instrumentation, but British music was highly influenced by continental developments, while British composers made an important contribution to many of the major movements in early music in Europe, including the polyphony of the Ars Nova and laid some of the foundations of later national and international classical music. Musicians from the British Isles also developed some distinctive forms of music, including Celtic chant, the Contenance Angloise, the rota, polyphonic votive antiphons, and the carol in the medieval era and English madrigals, lute ayres, and masques in the Renaissance era, which would lead to the development of English language opera at the height of the Baroque in the 18th century.

== Medieval music to 1450 ==
Surviving sources indicate that there was a rich and varied musical soundscape in medieval Britain. Historians usually distinguish between ecclesiastical music, designed for use in church, or in religious ceremonies, and secular music for use from royal and baronial courts, celebrations of some religious events, to public and private entertainments of the people. Our understanding of this music is limited by a lack of written sources for much of what was an oral culture.

=== Church music ===
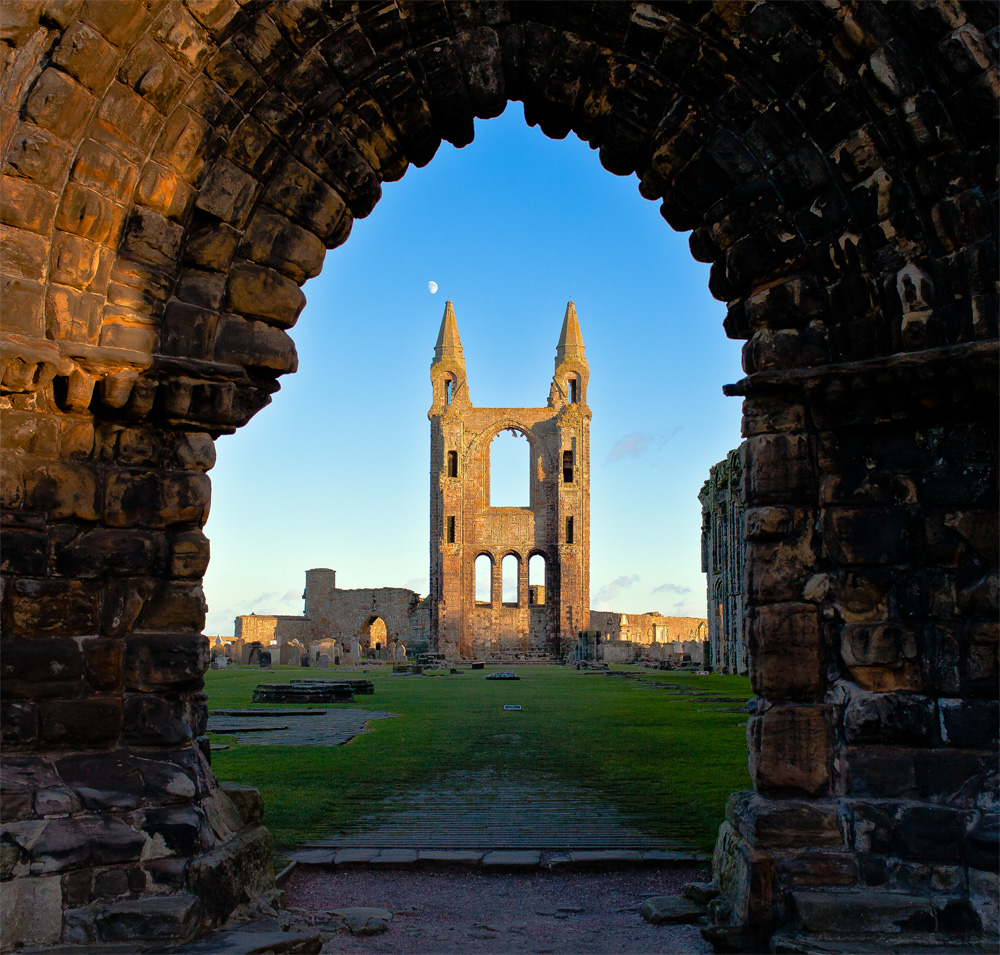
St Andrews Cathedral, associated with the important 13th century 'Wolfenbüttel 677' manuscript

In the early Middle Ages, ecclesiastical music was dominated by monophonic plainchant. The separate development of British Christianity from the direct influence of Rome until the 8th century, with its flourishing monastic culture, led to the development of a distinct form of liturgical Celtic chant. Although no notations of this music survive, later sources suggest distinctive melodic patterns. This was superseded, as elsewhere in Europe, from the 11th century by Gregorian chant. The version of this chant linked to the liturgy as used in the Diocese of Salisbury, the Sarum Use, first recorded from the 13th century, became dominant in England. This Sarum Chant became the model for English composers until it was supplanted at the Reformation in the mid-16th century, influencing settings for masses, hymns and Magnificats. Scottish music was highly influenced by continental developments, with figures like thirteenth-century musical theorist Simon Tailler who studied in Paris, before returning to Scotland where he introduced several reforms of church music. Scottish collections of music like the thirteenth-century 'Wolfenbüttel 677', which is associated with St Andrews, contain mostly French compositions, but with some distinctive local styles. The first notations of Welsh music that survive are from the 14th century, including matins, lauds and vespers for St David's Day.

==== Ars nova ====
In the 14th century, the English Franciscan friar Simon Tunsted, usually credited with the authorship of Quatuor Principalia Musicae: a treatise on musical composition, is believed to have been one of the theorists who influenced the 'ars nova', a movement which developed in France and then Italy, replacing the restrictive styles of Gregorian plainchant with complex polyphony. The tradition was well established in England by the 15th century and was widely used in religious, and what became, purely educational establishments, including Eton College, and the colleges that became the Universities of Oxford and Cambridge. The motet 'Sub Arturo plebs' attributed to Johannes Alanus and dated to the mid or late 14th century, includes a list of Latinised names of musicians from the English court that shows the flourishing of court music, the importance of royal patronage in this era and the growing influence of the ars nova. Included in the list is J. de Alto Bosco, who has been identified with the composer and theorist John Hanboys, author of Summa super musicam continuam et discretam, a work that discusses the origins of musical notation and mensuration from the 13th century and proposed several new methods for recording music.

==== Contenance Angloise ====
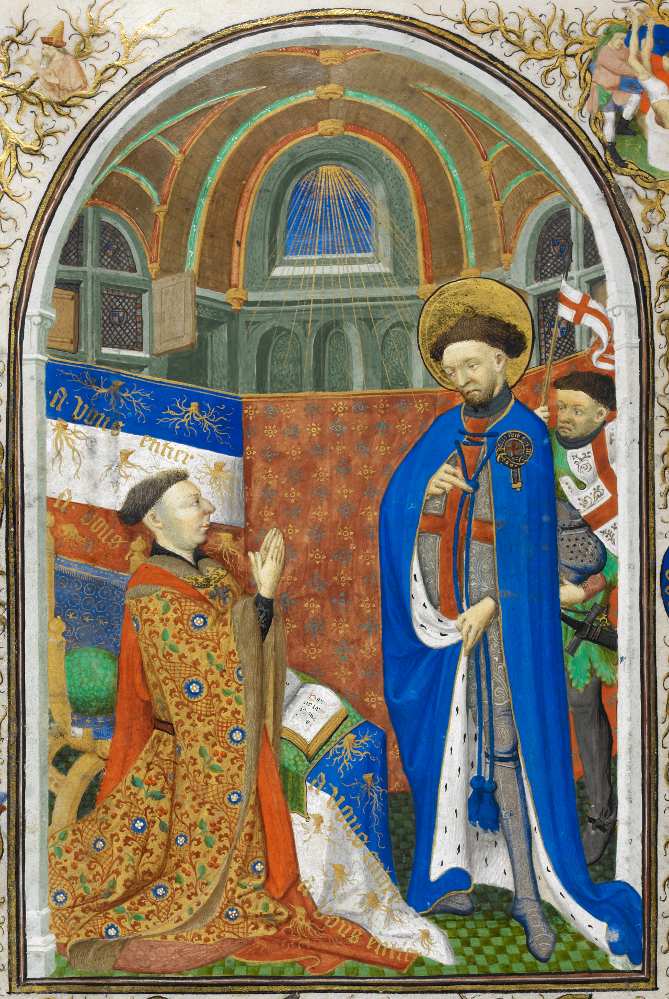
John of Lancaster, 1st Duke of Bedford, a major patron of music

From the mid-15th century we begin to have relatively large numbers of works that have survived from English composers in documents such as the early 15th century Old Hall Manuscript. Probably the first, and one of the best represented is Leonel Power (c. 1380–1445), who was probably the choir master of Christ Church, Canterbury and enjoyed noble patronage from Thomas of Lancaster, 1st Duke of Clarence and John of Lancaster, 1st Duke of Bedford (1389–1435). John Dunstaple (or Dunstable) was the most celebrated composer of the 'Contenance Angloise' (English manner), a distinctive style of polyphony that used full, rich harmonies based on the third and sixth, which was highly influential in the fashionable Burgundian court of Philip the Good. Nearly all his manuscript music in England was lost during the Dissolution of the Monasteries (1536–1540), but some of his works have been reconstructed from copies found in continental Europe, particularly in Italy. The existence of these copies is testament to his widespread fame within Europe. He may have been the first composer to provide liturgical music with an instrumental accompaniment. Royal interest in music is suggested by the works attributed to Roy Henry in the Old Hall Manuscript, suspected to be Henry IV or Henry V. This tradition was continued by figures such as Walter Frye (c. 1420–1475), whose masses were recorded and highly influential in France and the Netherlands. Similarly, John Hothby (c. 1410–1487), an English Carmelite friar, who travelled widely and, although leaving little composed music, wrote several theoretical treatises, including La Calliopea legale, and is credited with introducing innovations to the medieval pitch system. The Scottish king James I was in captivity in England from 1406 to 1423, where he earned a reputation as a poet and composer and may have been responsible for taking English and continental styles and musicians back to the Scottish court on his release.

=== Secular music ===
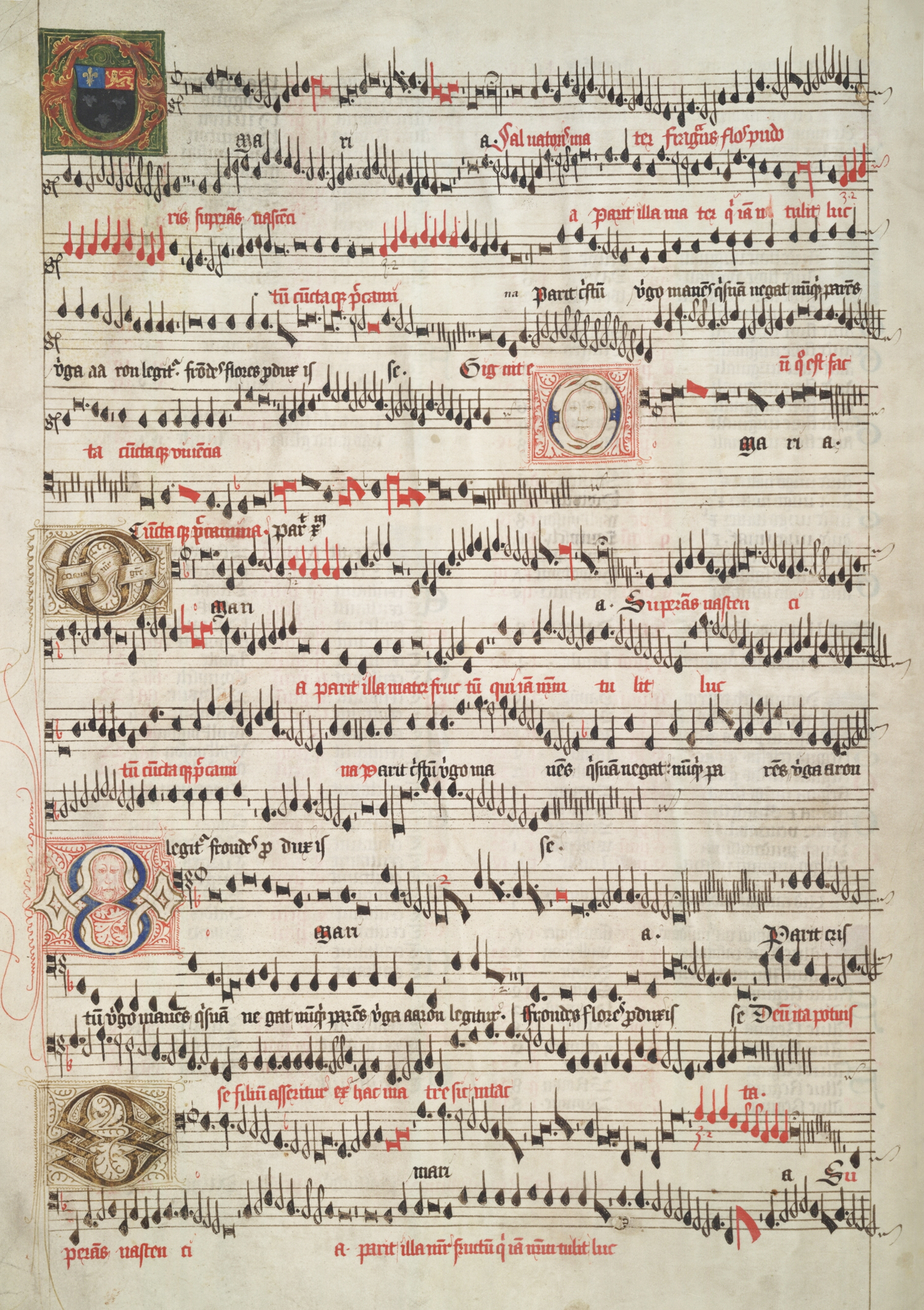
O Maria salvatoris, from the Eton Choirbook

Ireland, Scotland, and Wales shared a tradition of bards, who acted as musicians, but also as poets, story tellers, historians, genealogists, and lawyers, relying on an oral tradition that stretched back generations. Often accompanying themselves on the harp, they can also be seen in records of the Scottish courts throughout the medieval period. We also know from the work of Gerald of Wales that at least from the 12th century, group singing was a major part of the social life of ordinary people in Wales. From the 11th century particularly important in English secular music were minstrels, sometimes attached to a wealthy household, noble, or royal court, but probably more often moving from place to place and occasion to occasion in pursuit of payment. Many appear to have composed their own works, and can be seen as the first secular composers, and some crossed international boundaries, transferring songs and styles of music. Because literacy, and musical notation in particular, were preserves of the clergy in this period the survival of secular music is much more limited than for church music. Nevertheless, some were noted, occasionally by clergymen who had an interest in secular music. England in particular produced three distinctive secular musical forms in this period: the rota, the polyphonic votive antiphon, and the carol.

==== Rotas ====
A rota is a form of round, known to have been used from the 13th century in England. The earliest surviving piece of composed music in the British Isles, and perhaps the oldest recorded folk song in Europe, is a rota: a setting of 'Sumer Is Icumen In' ('Summer is a-coming in') from the mid-13th century, possibly written by W. de Wycombe, precentor of the priory of Leominster in Herefordshire, and set for six parts. Although few are recorded, the use of rotas seems to have been widespread in England and it has been suggested that the English talent for polyphony may have its origins in this form of music.

==== Votive Antiphons ====
Polyphonic votive antiphons emerged in England in the 14th century as a setting of a text honouring the Virgin Mary, but separate from the mass and office, often after compline. Towards the end of the 15th century they began to be written by English composers as expanded settings for as many as nine parts with increasing complexity and vocal range. The largest collection of such antiphons is in the late 15th century Eton choirbook.

==== Carols ====
Carols developed in the 14th century as simple songs with a verse and refrain structure. Carols were usually connected with a religious festival, particularly Christmas. They were derived from a form of circle dance accompanied by singers, which was popular from the mid-12th century. From the 14th century they were used as processional songs, particularly at Advent, Easter, and Christmas, and to accompany religious mystery plays. Because the tradition of carols continued into the modern era, we know more of their structure and variety than most other secular forms of medieval music.

== Renaissance c. 1450–c. 1660 ==
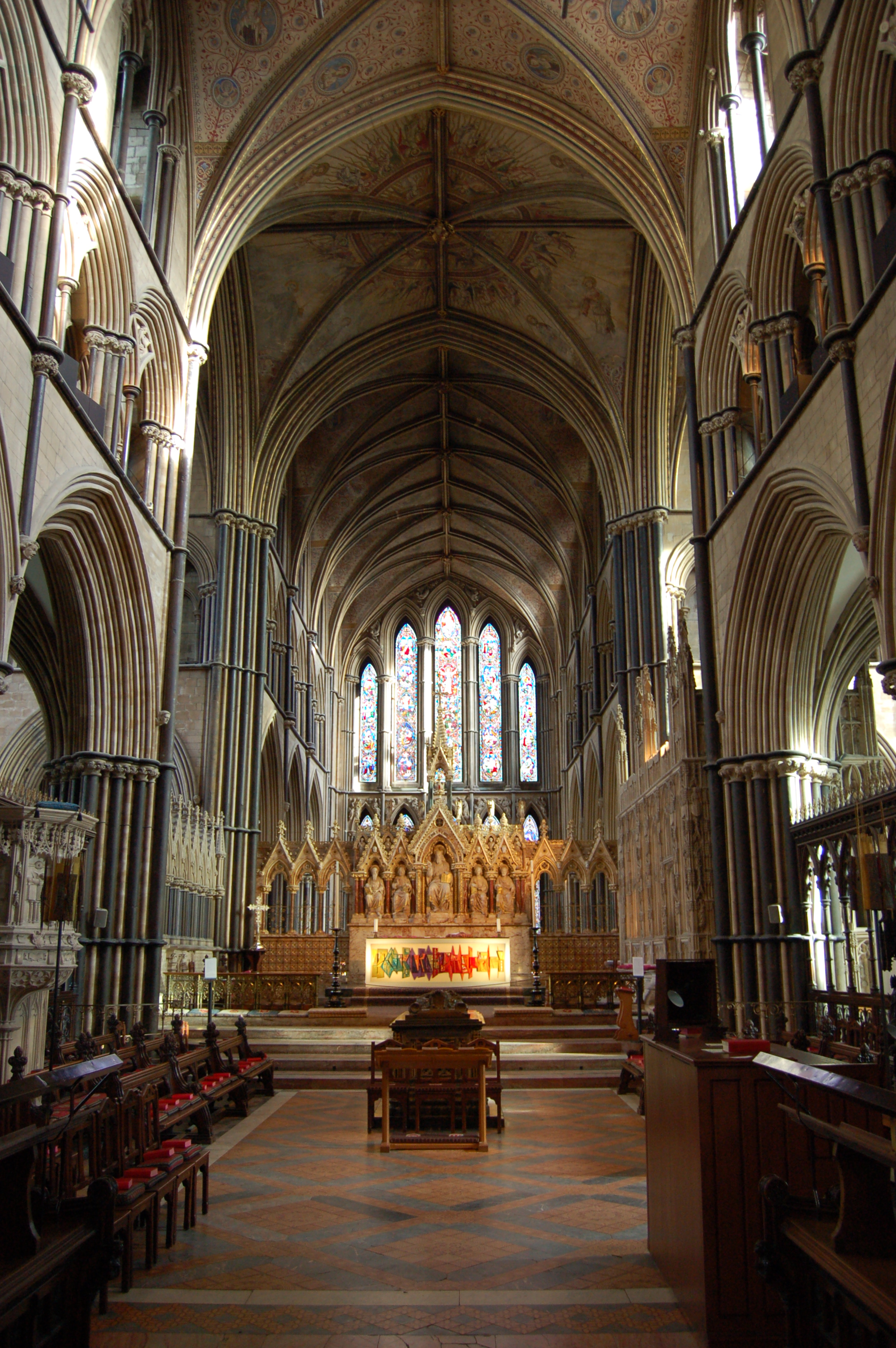
The east end of Worcester Cathedral, where Henry Abyngdon was Master of Music from 1465 to 1483

The impact of Renaissance humanism on music can be seen in England the late 15th century under Edward IV (r. 1461–1483) and Henry VII (r. 1485–1509). Although the influence of English music on the continent declined from the mid-15th century as the Burgundian School became the dominant force in the West, English music continued to flourish with the first composers being awarded doctorates at Oxford and Cambridge, including Thomas Santriste, who was provost of King's College, Cambridge, and Henry Abyngdon, who was Master of Music at Worcester Cathedral and from 1465 to 1483 Master of the King's Music. Edward IV chartered and patronised the first guild of musicians in London in 1472, a pattern copied in other major towns cities as musicians formed guilds or waites, creating local monopolies with greater organisation, but arguably ending the role of the itinerant minstrel. There were increasing numbers of foreign musicians, particularly those from France and the Netherlands, at the court, becoming a majority of those known to have been employed by the death of Henry VII. His mother, Lady Margaret Beaufort, was the major sponsor of music during his reign, commissioning several settings for new liturgical feasts and ordinary of the mass. The result was a very elaborate style which balanced the many parts of the setting and prefigured Renaissance developments elsewhere. Similar developments can be seen in Scotland. In the late 15th century a series of Scottish musicians trained in the Netherlands before returning home, including John Broune, Thomas Inglis and John Fety, the last of whom became master of the song school in Aberdeen and then Edinburgh, introducing the new five-fingered organ playing technique. In 1501 James IV refounded the Chapel Royal within Stirling Castle, with a new and enlarged choir, it became the focus of Scottish liturgical music. Burgundian and English influences came north with Henry VII's daughter Margaret Tudor, who married James IV in 1503. In Wales, as elsewhere, the local nobility were increasingly Anglicised and the bardic tradition started to decline, resulting in the first Eisteddfods being held from 1527, in an attempt to preserve the tradition. In this period it seems that most Welsh composers tended to cross the border and seek employment in the English royal and noble households, including John Lloyd (c. 1475–1523) who was employed in the household of the Edward Stafford, 3rd Duke of Buckingham and became a Gentleman of the Chapel Royal from 1509 and Robert Jones (fl.c.1520–35) who also became a gentleman of the Chapel Royal.

=== Henry VIII and James V ===
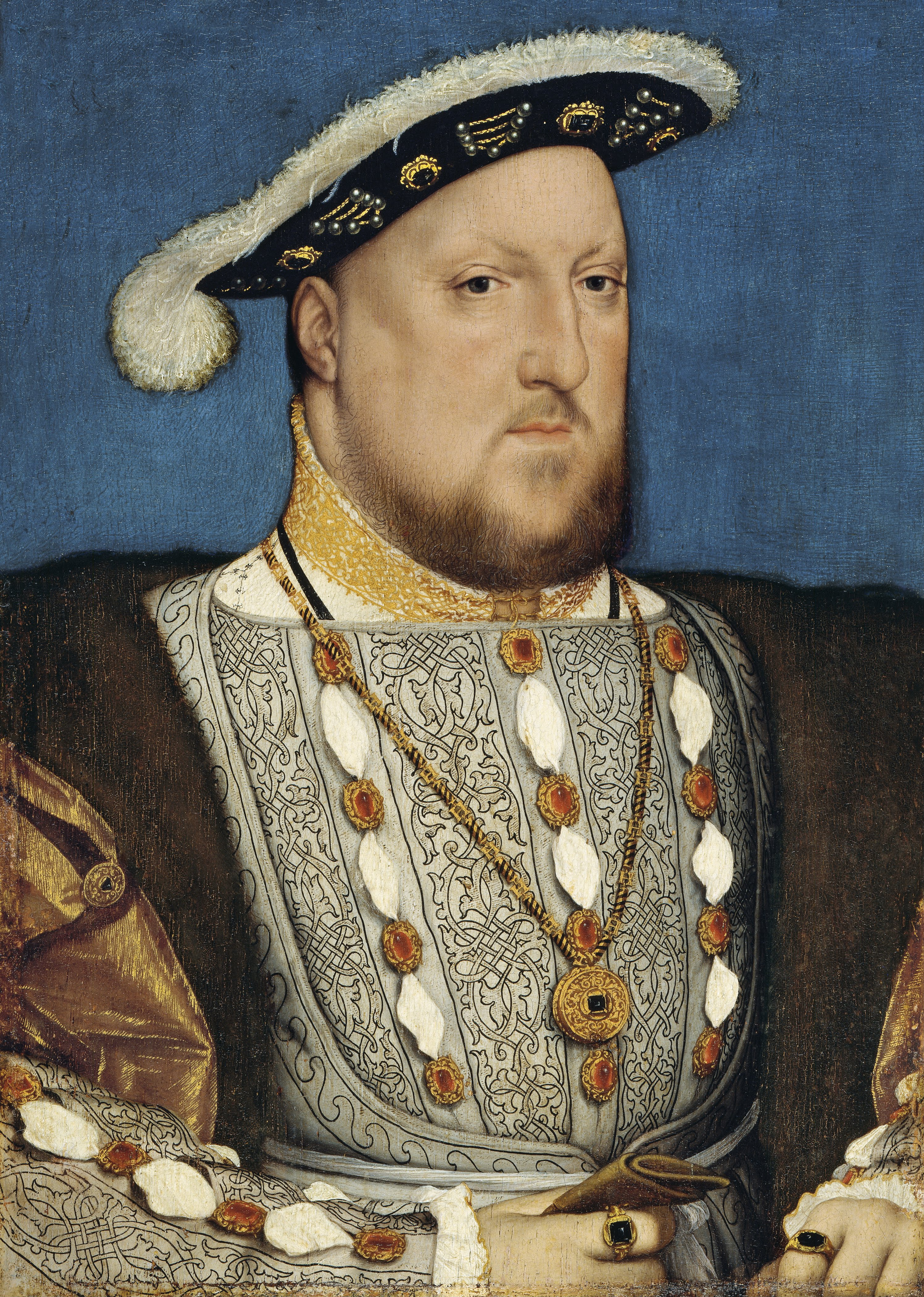
Henry VIII of England

Henry VIII and James V were both enthusiastic patrons of music. Henry (1491–1547) played various instruments, of which he had a large collection, including, at his death, seventy eight recorders. He is sometimes credited with compositions, including the part-song 'Pastime with Good Company'. In the early part of his reign and his marriage to Catherine of Aragon secular court music focused around an emphasis on courtly love, probably acquired from the Burgundian court, result in compositions like William Cornysh's (1465–1515) 'Yow and I and Amyas'. Among the most eminent musicians of Henry VIII's reign was John Taverner (1490–1545), organist of the College founded at Oxford by Thomas Wolsey from 1526 to 1530. His principal works include masses, magnificats and motets, of which the most famous is 'Dum Transisset Sabbatum'. Thomas Tallis (c. 1505–85) took polyphonic composition to new heights with works like his 'Spem in alium', a motet for forty independent voices. In Scotland James V (1512–42) had a similar interest in music. A talented lute player he introduced French chansons and consorts of viols to his court and was patron to composers such as David Peebles (c. 1510–1579?).

=== Reformation ===
The Reformation naturally had a profound impact on the religious music of Britain. The loss of many abbeys, collegiate churches and religious orders intensified a process by which humanism had made careers writing church music decline in importance compared with employment in the royal and noble households. Many composers also responded to the liturgical changes brought about by the Reformation. From the 1540s during the Reformation in England sacred music was being set to English language texts along with Latin. The legacy of Tallis includes the harmonised versions of the plainsong responses of the English church service that are still in use by the Church of England. The Lutheranism that influenced the early Scottish Reformation attempted to accommodate Catholic musical traditions into worship, drawing on Latin hymns and vernacular songs. The most important product of this tradition in Scotland was The Gude and Godlie Ballatis, which were spiritual satires on popular ballads composed by the brothers James, John and Robert Wedderburn. Never adopted by the kirk, they nevertheless remained popular and were reprinted from the 1540s to the 1620s. Later the Calvinism that came to dominate the Scottish Reformation was much more hostile to Catholic musical tradition and popular music, placing an emphasis on what was biblical, which meant the Psalms. The Scottish psalter of 1564 was commissioned by the Assembly of the Church. It drew on the work of French musician Clément Marot, Calvin's contributions to the Strasbourg psalter of 1539 and English writers, particularly the 1561 edition of the psalter produced by William Whittingham for the English congregation in Geneva. The intention was to produce individual tunes for each psalm, but of 150 psalms, 105 had proper tunes and in the seventeenth century, common tunes, which could be used for psalms with the same metre, became more common. The need for simplicity for whole congregations that would now all sing these psalms, unlike the trained choirs who had sung the many parts of polyphonic hymns, necessitated simplicity and most church compositions were confined to homophonic settings. There is some evidence that polyphony survived and it was incorporated into editions of the psalter from 1625, but usually with the congregation singing the melody and trained singers the contra-tenor, treble and bass parts.

=== Music publication ===
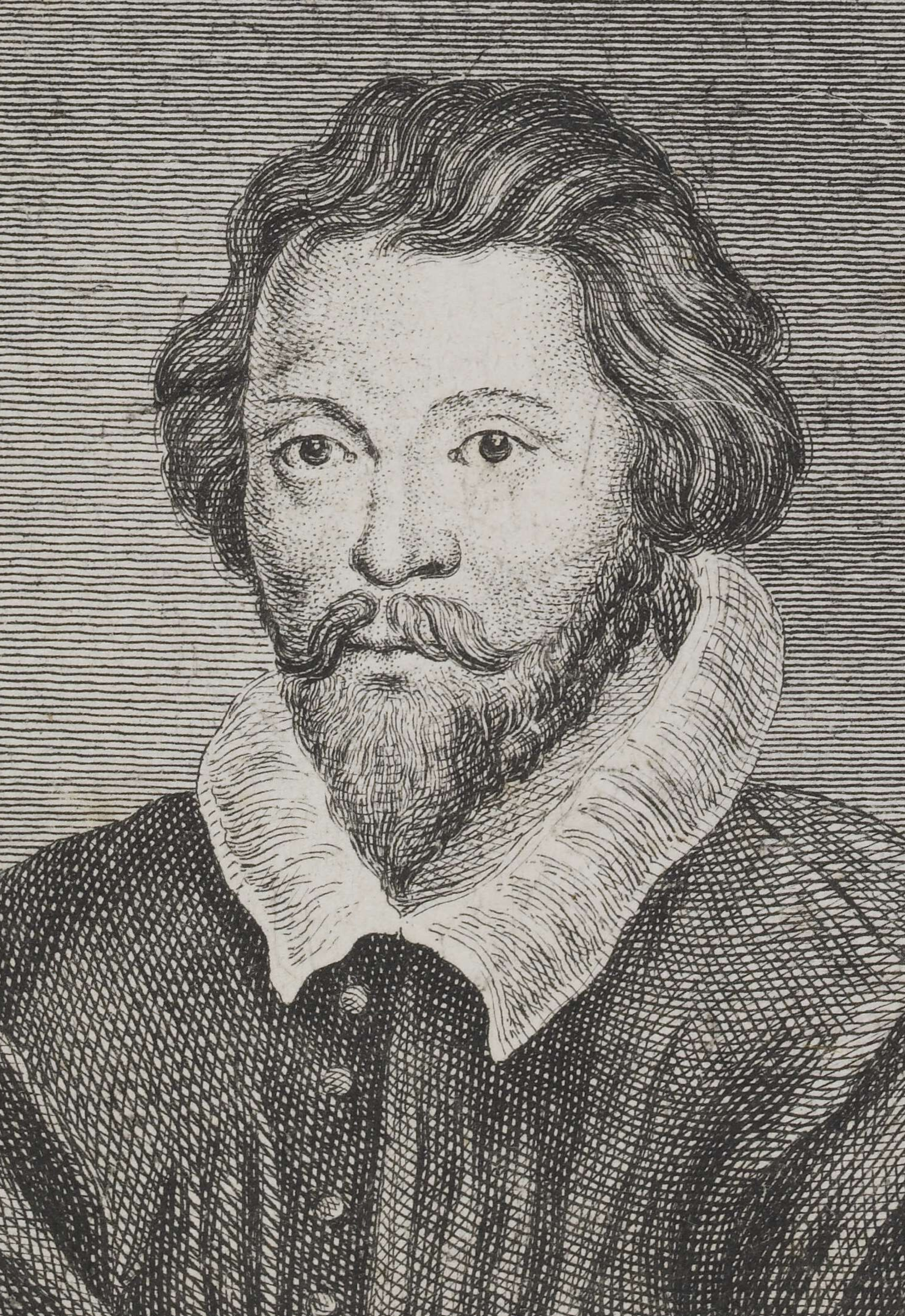
William Byrd, one of the key English composers of the reign of Elizabeth I

During this period, music printing (technically more complex than the printing of written text) was adopted from continental practice. Around 1520 John Rastell initiated the single-impression method for printing music, in which the staff lines, words, and notes were all part of a single piece of type, making it much easier to produce, although not necessarily clearer. Elizabeth I granted the monopoly of music publishing to Tallis and his pupil William Byrd which ensured that their works were widely distributed and have survived in various editions, but arguably limited the potential for music publishing in Britain.

=== Mary, Queen of Scots and Elizabeth I ===
James V's daughter, Mary, Queen of Scots, also played the lute, virginals and (unlike her father) was a fine singer. She was brought up in the French court and brought many influences from there when she returned to rule Scotland from 1561, employing lutenists and viol players in her household. Mary's position as a Catholic gave a new lease of life to the choir of the Scottish Chapel Royal in her reign, but the destruction of Scottish church organs meant that instrumentation to accompany the mass had to employ bands of musicians with trumpets, drums, fifes, bagpipes and tabors. In England her cousin Elizabeth I was also trained in music. She played the lute, virginals, sang, danced, and even claimed to have composed dance music. She was major patron for English musicians composers (particularly in the Chapel Royal) while in her royal household she employed numerous foreign musicians in her consorts of viols, flutes, recorders, and sackbuts and shawms. Byrd emerged as the leading composer of the Elizabethan court, writing sacred and secular polyphony, viol, keyboard and consort music, reflecting the growth in the range of instruments and forms of music available in Tudor and Stuart Britain. The outstanding Scottish composer of the era was Robert Carver (c.1485–c.1570) whose works included the nineteen-part motet 'O Bone Jesu'.

=== English Madrigal School ===
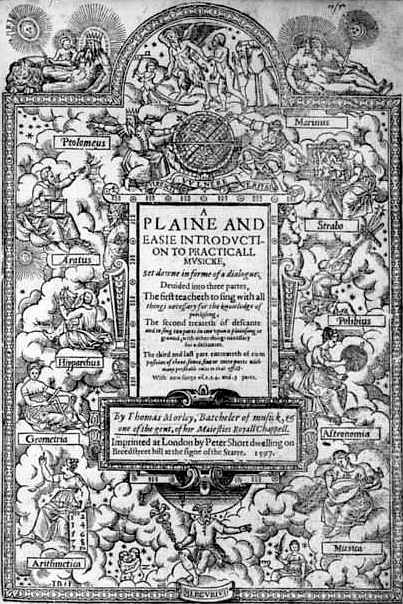
Title page of Morley's Plaine and Easie Introduction to Practicall Musicke (1597)

The English Madrigal School was the brief but intense flowering of the musical madrigal in England, mostly from 1588 to 1627. Based on the Italian musical form and patronised by Elizabeth I after the highly popular Musica transalpina by Nicholas Yonge in 1588. English madrigals were a cappella, predominantly light in style, and generally began as either copies or direct translations of Italian models, mostly set for three to six verses. The most influential composers of madrigals in England whose work has survived were Thomas Morley, Thomas Weelkes and John Wilbye. One of the more notable compilations of English madrigals was The Triumphs of Oriana, a collection of madrigals compiled by Thomas Morley and devoted to Elizabeth I. Madrigals continued to be composed in England through the 1620s, but stopped in the early 1630s as they began to seem obsolete as new forms of music began to emerge from the continent.

=== Lute ayres ===
Also emerging from the Elizabethan court were ayres, solo songs, occasionally with more (usually three) parts, accompanied on a lute. Their popularity began with the publication of John Dowland's (1563–1626) First Booke of Songs or Ayres (1597). Dowland had travelled extensively in Europe and probably based his ayres on the Italian monody and French air de cour. His most famous ayres include "Come again", "Flow, my tears", "I saw my Lady weepe" and "In darkness let me dwell". The genre was further developed by Thomas Campion (1567–1620), whose Books of Airs (1601) (co-written with Philip Rosseter) containing over one hundred lute songs and which was reprinted four times in the 1610s. Although this printing boom died out in the 1620s ayres continued to be written and performed and were often incorporated into court masques.

=== Consort music ===
Consorts of instruments developed in the Tudor period in England as either 'whole' consorts, that is, all instruments of the same family (for example, a set of viols played together) and a 'mixed' or 'broken' consort, consisting of instruments from various families (for example viols and lute). Major forms of music composed for consorts included: fantasias, In Nomines, variations, dances, and fantasia-suites. Many of the major composers of the 16th and 17th centuries produced work for consorts, including William Byrd, Giovanni Coperario, Orlando Gibbons, John Jenkins and Henry Purcell.

=== Masques ===
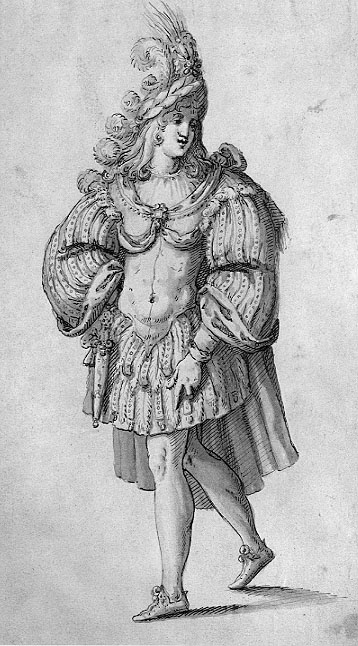
Costume for a Knight, by Inigo Jones

Campion was also a composer of court masques, an elaborate performance involving music and dancing, singing and acting, within a complex stage design, in which the architectural framing and costumes might be designed by a renowned architect, such as Inigo Jones, to present a deferential allegory flattering to a noble or royal patron. These developed out of the medieval tradition of guising in the early Tudor period and became increasingly complex under Elizabeth I, James VI and I and Charles I. Professional actors and musicians were hired for the speaking and singing parts. Shakespeare included masque like sections in many of his plays and Ben Jonson is known to have written them. Often, the masquers who did not speak or sing were courtiers: James I's Queen Consort, Anne of Denmark, frequently danced with her ladies in masques between 1603 and 1611, and Charles I performed in the masques at his court. The masque largely ended with the closure of the theatres and the exile of the court under the Commonwealth.

=== Music in the theatre ===
Performances of Elizabethan and Jacobean plays frequently included the use of music, with performances on organs, lutes, viols and pipes for up to an hour before the actual performance, and texts indicates that they were used during the plays. Plays, perhaps particularly the heavier histories and tragedies, were frequently broken up with a short musical play, perhaps derived from the Italian intermezzo, with music, jokes and dancing, known as a 'jigg' and from which the jig dance derives its name. After the closure of the London theatres in 1642 these tendencies developed into sung plays that are recognisable as English Operas, the first usually being thought of as William Davenant's (1606–68) The Siege of Rhodes (1656), originally given in a private performance. The development of native English opera had to wait for the Restoration of the monarchy in 1660 and the patronage of Charles II.

=== James VI and I and Charles I 1567–1642 ===
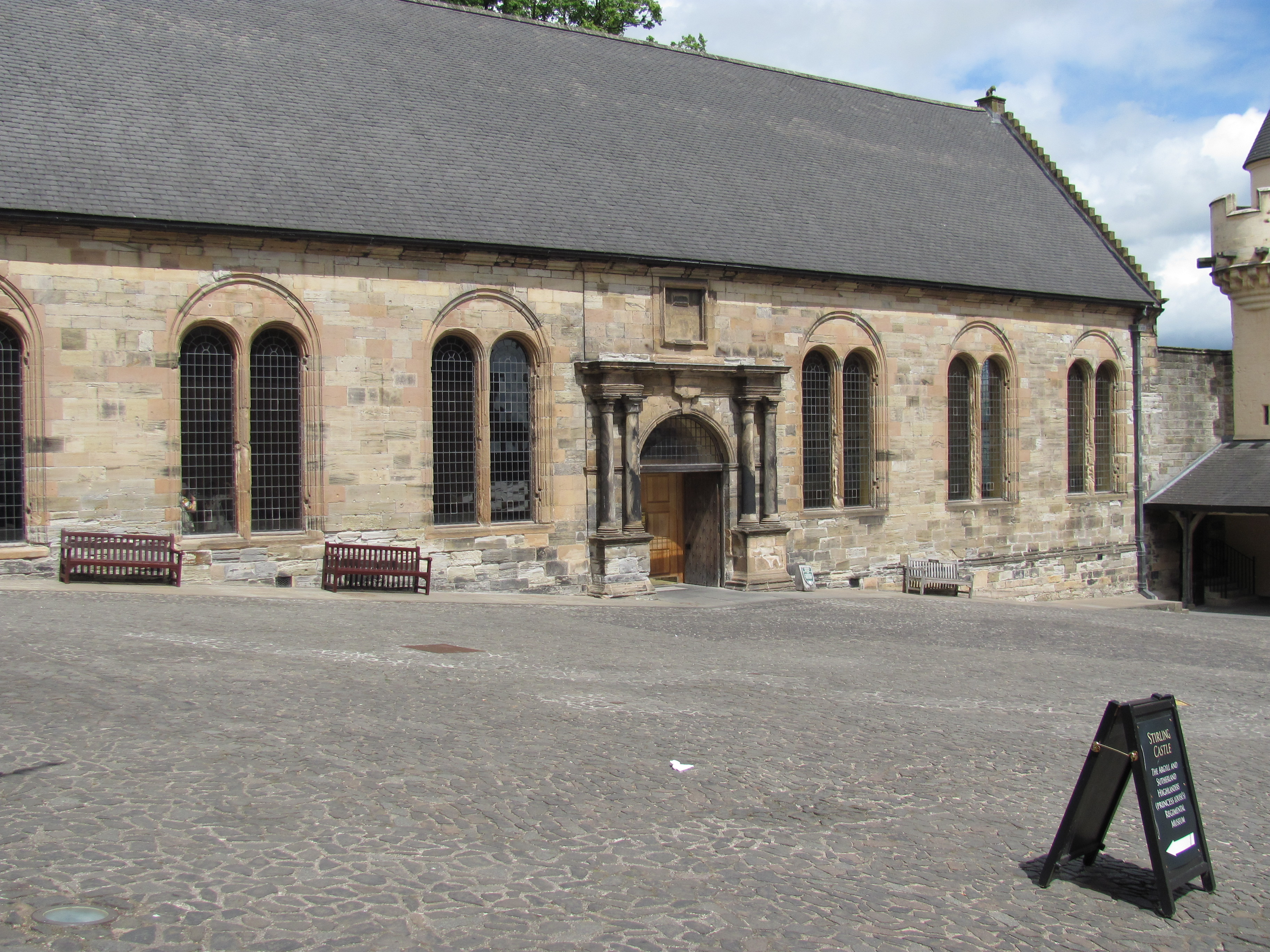
The Chapel Royal in Stirling Castle, the location of Scottish coronations and royal musical patronage until the ascension of James VI to the English throne

James VI, king of Scotland from 1567, was a major patron of the arts in general. He made statutory provision to reform and promote the teaching of music. He rebuilt the Chapel Royal at Stirling in 1594 and the choir was used for state occasions like the baptism of his son Henry. He followed the tradition of employing lutenists for his private entertainment, as did other members of his family. When he went south to take the throne of England in 1603 as James I, he removed one of the major sources of patronage in Scotland. The Scottish Chapel Royal was now used only for occasional state visits, beginning to fall into disrepair, and from now on the court in Westminster would be the only major source of royal musical patronage. When Charles I returned in 1633 to be crowned he brought many musicians from the English Chapel Royal for the service. Both James and his son Charles I, king from 1625, continued the Elizabethan patronage of church music, where the focus remained on settings of Anglican services and anthems, employing the long lived Byrd and then following in his footsteps composers such as Orlando Gibbons (1583–1625) and Thomas Tomkins (1572–1656). The emphasis on the liturgical content of services under Charles I, associated with Archbishop William Laud, meant a need for fuller musical accompaniment. In 1626 the musical establishment of the royal household was sufficient to necessitate the creation of a new office of 'Master of the King's Music' and probably the most important composer of the reign was William Lawes (1602–45), who produced fantasia suites, consort music for harp, viols and organ and music for individual instruments, including lutes. This establishment was disrupted by the outbreak of English Civil War in 1642, but a smaller musical establishment was kept at the King's alternative capital at Oxford for the duration of the conflict.

=== Civil War and Commonwealth 1642–1660 ===
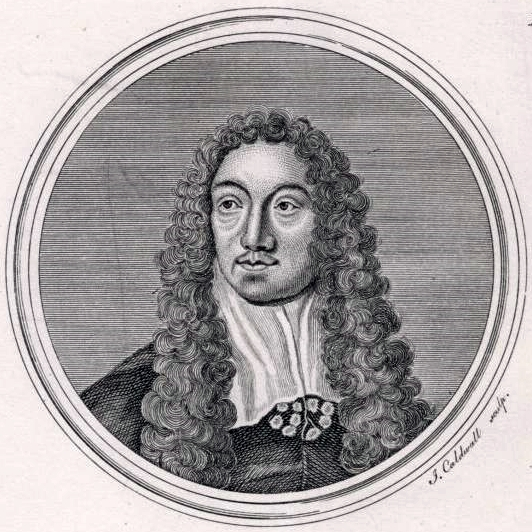
Matthew Locke a major composer for consort of viols

The period between the ascendancy of Parliament in London in 1642, to the Restoration of the monarchy in 1660, radically changed the pattern of British music. The loss of the court removed the major source of patronage, the theatres were closed in London in 1642 and certain forms of music, particularly those associated with traditional events or the liturgical calendar (like morris dancing and carols), and certain forms of church music, including collegiate choirs and organs, were discouraged or abolished where parliament was able to enforce its authority. As a counterpoint to this abolition of choirs, new forms of church music were developed, such as lining out, which was developed to improve congregational singing amongst the illiterate classes.

There was, however, no Puritan ban on secular music and Cromwell had the organ from Magdalen College, Oxford set up at Hampton Court Palace and employed an organist and other musicians. Musical entertainment was provided at official receptions, and at the wedding of Cromwell's daughter. Since the opportunities for large scale composition and public performance were limited, music under the Protectorate became a largely private matter and flourished in domestic settings, particularly in the larger private houses. The consort of viols enjoyed a resurgence in popularity and leading composers of new pieces were John Jenkins and Matthew Locke. Christopher Simpson's work, The Division Violist, first published in 1659, was for many years the leading manual on playing the viol and on the art of extemporising "divisions to a ground", in Britain and continental Europe and is still used as a reference by early music revivalists.

== See also ==
- Classical music of the United Kingdom
- Chronological list of Scottish classical composers
- Music of the United Kingdom
- Early music
- Mary Remnant
