= Music in Medieval England =

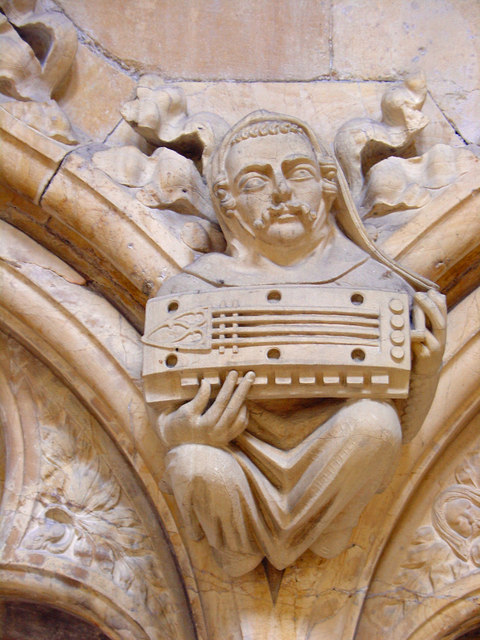
A medieval carving of a symphonia player from Beverley Minster

Music in Medieval England, from the end of Roman rule in the fifth century until the Reformation in the sixteenth century, was a diverse and rich culture, including sacred and secular music and ranging from the popular to the elite.

The sources of English secular music are much more limited than for ecclesiastical music. Medieval musicians had a wide variety of instruments available to them. The Anglo-Saxon scop and gleeman were replaced in the thirteenth century by the minstrel.

In the early Middle Ages, ecclesiastical music was dominated by monophonic plainchant, the separate development of British Christianity until the eighth century, led to the development of a distinct form of liturgical Celtic chant. This was superseded, from the eleventh century by Gregorian chant. England retained unique forms of music and of instrumentation, but English music was highly influenced by continental developments, while British composers made an important contribution to many of the major movements in early music in Europe, including the polyphony of the Ars Nova and laid some of the foundations of later national and international classical music. English musicians also developed some distinctive forms of music, including the Contenance Angloise, the rota, polyphonic votive antiphons and the carol and the ballad.

The impact of humanism on music can be seen in England the late fifteenth century. Edward IV chartered and patronised the first guild of musicians in London in 1472, a pattern copied in other major towns cities as musicians formed guilds or waites, creating local monopolies with greater organisation, but arguably ending the role of the itinerant minstrel. There were increasing numbers of foreign musicians, particularly those from France and the Netherlands, at the court. The result was a very elaborate style which balanced the many parts of the setting and prefigured Renaissance developments elsewhere.

== Sources ==
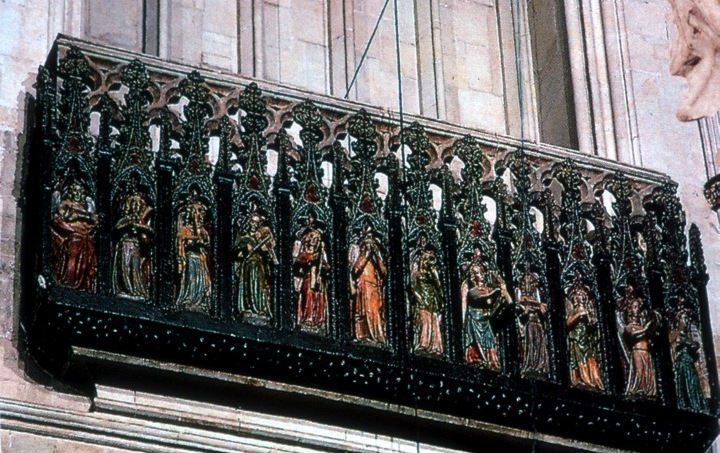
The Minstrel's Gallery, Exeter Cathedral, shows angels with a variety of contemporary instruments

Surviving sources indicate that there was a rich and varied musical soundscape in medieval England. Historians usually distinguish between ecclesiastical music, designed for use in church, or in religious ceremonies, and secular music for use in places from royal and baronial courts, celebrations of some religious events, to public and private entertainments of the people. Because literacy, and musical notation in particular, were preserves of the clergy in this period, the survival of secular music is much more limited than for church music. Nevertheless, some were noted, often by clergymen who had an interest in secular music.

== Instruments and musicians ==
Medieval musicians had a wide variety of instruments available to them. These included the shawm, fiddles, rebec, crwth, portative organ, trumpet, timbrel, lute and bagpipe. In Anglo-Saxon England, the professional poet was known as a scop ("shaper" or "maker"). Often attached to a royal or noble court, he composed his own poems, and sang them accompanied by an instrument, usually a harp. Beneath the scop was the gleeman, who was usually itinerant, and performed the works of others. In the late thirteenth century, the term minstrel began to be used to designate a performer who earned their living with poetry and song. They often performed other entertainments, such as jesting and acrobatics.

== Earliest music ==
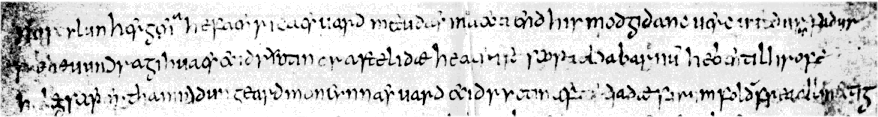
One of two candidates for the earliest surviving copy of "Cædmon's Hymn" is found in "The Moore Bede" (c. 737) which is held by the Cambridge University Library.

The Venerable Bede's story of the cattleman, and later ecclesiastical musician, Cædmon, indicates that at feasts in the early medieval period it was normal to pass around the harp and sing 'vain and idle songs'. The existence of an oral tradition of music is suggested by Aldhelm, who was of Bishop of Sherborne from 715, and who set religious lyrics to popular songs in order to spread the Christian message. Thanks to Bede, one of Cædmon's songs survive as "Cædmon's Hymn", but since this type of music was rarely notated, there is now little knowledge of its form or content.

== Church music ==
Robertsbridge Codex
An Estampie in polyphonic two-handed organ music from the Robertsbridge Codex

In the early Middle Ages, ecclesiastical music was dominated by monophonic plainchant. The separate development of British Christianity from the direct influence of Rome until the eighth century, with its flourishing monastic culture, led to the development of a distinct form of liturgical Celtic chant. Although no notations of this music survive, later sources suggest distinctive melodic patterns. This was superseded, as elsewhere in Europe, from the eleventh century by Gregorian chant. The version of this chant linked to the liturgy as used in the Diocese of Salisbury, the Sarum Use, first recorded from the thirteenth century, became dominant in England. This Sarum Chant became the model for English composers until it was supplanted at the Reformation in the mid-sixteenth century, influencing settings for masses, hymns and Magnificats. Singing techniques called gymel, a technique of temporarily dividing up one voice part, usually an upper one, into two parts of equal range, but singing different music, were introduced in England in the thirteenth century. Church music was often accompanied by instruments such as the guitar, harp, pipes and organ. The earliest evidence of two handed, polyphonic organ music is in the Robertsbridge Codex, from around 1325.

== Ars Nova ==
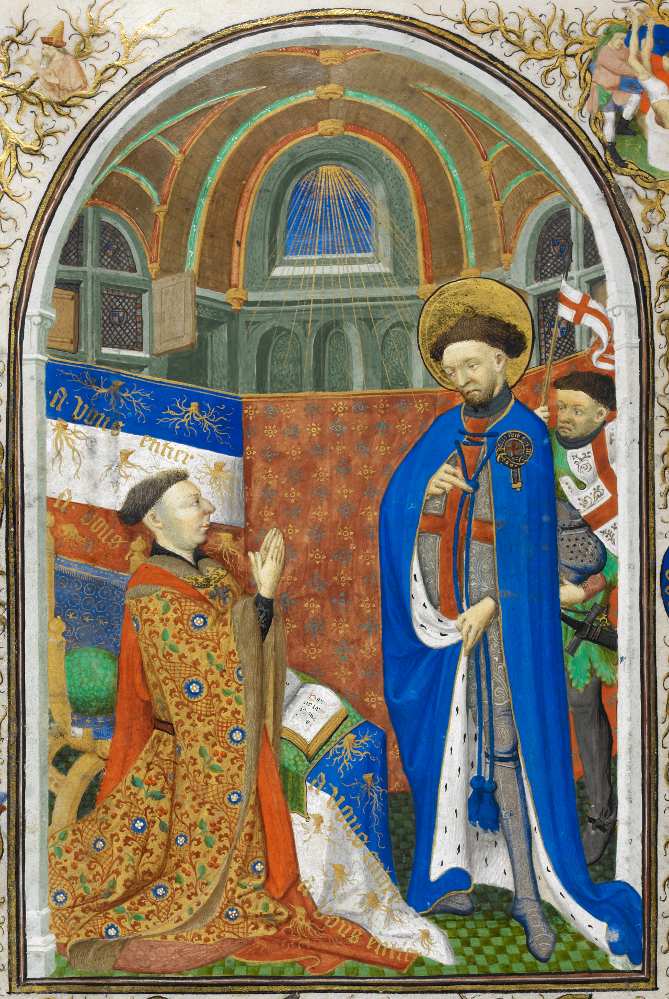
John of Lancaster, 1st Duke of Bedford, a major patron of music

In the fourteenth century, the English Franciscan friar Simon Tunsted (d. 1369), usually credited with the authorship of Quatuor Principalia Musicae: a treatise on musical composition, is believed to have been one of the theorists who influenced the 'Ars Nova', a movement which developed in France and then Italy, rejecting the restrictive styles of Gregorian plainchant in place of complex polyphony. The tradition was well established in England by the fifteenth century and was widely used in religious, and what became, purely educational establishments, including Eton College, and the colleges that became the Universities of Oxford and Cambridge. The motet 'Sub Arturo plebs' attributed to Johannes Alanus and dated to the mid or late fourteenth century, includes a list of Latinised names of musicians from the English court that shows the flourishing of court music, the importance of royal patronage in this era and the growing influence of the ars nova. Included in the list is J. de Alto Bosco, who has been identified with the composer and theorist John Hanboys, author of Summa super musicam continuam et discretam, a work that discusses the origins of musical notation and mensuration from the thirteenth century and proposed several new methods for recording music.

== Contenance Angloise ==
From the mid-fifteenth century there are relatively large numbers of works that have survived from English composers in documents such as the early fifteenth century Old Hall Manuscript. Probably the first, and one of the best represented is Leonel Power (c. 1380–1445), who was probably the choir master of Christ Church, Canterbury and enjoyed noble patronage from Thomas of Lancaster, 1st Duke of Clarence and John of Lancaster, 1st Duke of Bedford (1389–1435). John Dunstaple (or Dunstable) was the most celebrated composer of the 'Contenance Angloise' (English manner), a distinctive style of polyphony that used full, rich harmonies based on the third and sixth, which was highly influential in the fashionable Burgundian court of Philip the Good. Nearly all his manuscript music in England was lost during the Dissolution of the Monasteries (1536–40), but some of his works have been reconstructed from copies found in continental Europe, particularly in Italy. The existence of these copies is testament to his widespread fame within Europe. He may have been the first composer to provide liturgical music with an instrumental accompaniment. Royal interest in music is suggested by the works attributed to Roy Henry in the Old Hall Manuscript, suspected to be Henry IV or Henry V. This tradition was continued by figures such as Walter Frye (c. 1420–75), whose masses were recorded and highly influential in France and the Netherlands. Similarly, John Hothby (c. 1410–87), an English Carmelite friar, who travelled widely and, although leaving little composed music, wrote several theoretical treatises, including La Calliopea legale, and is credited with introducing innovations to the medieval pitch system.

== Rotas ==
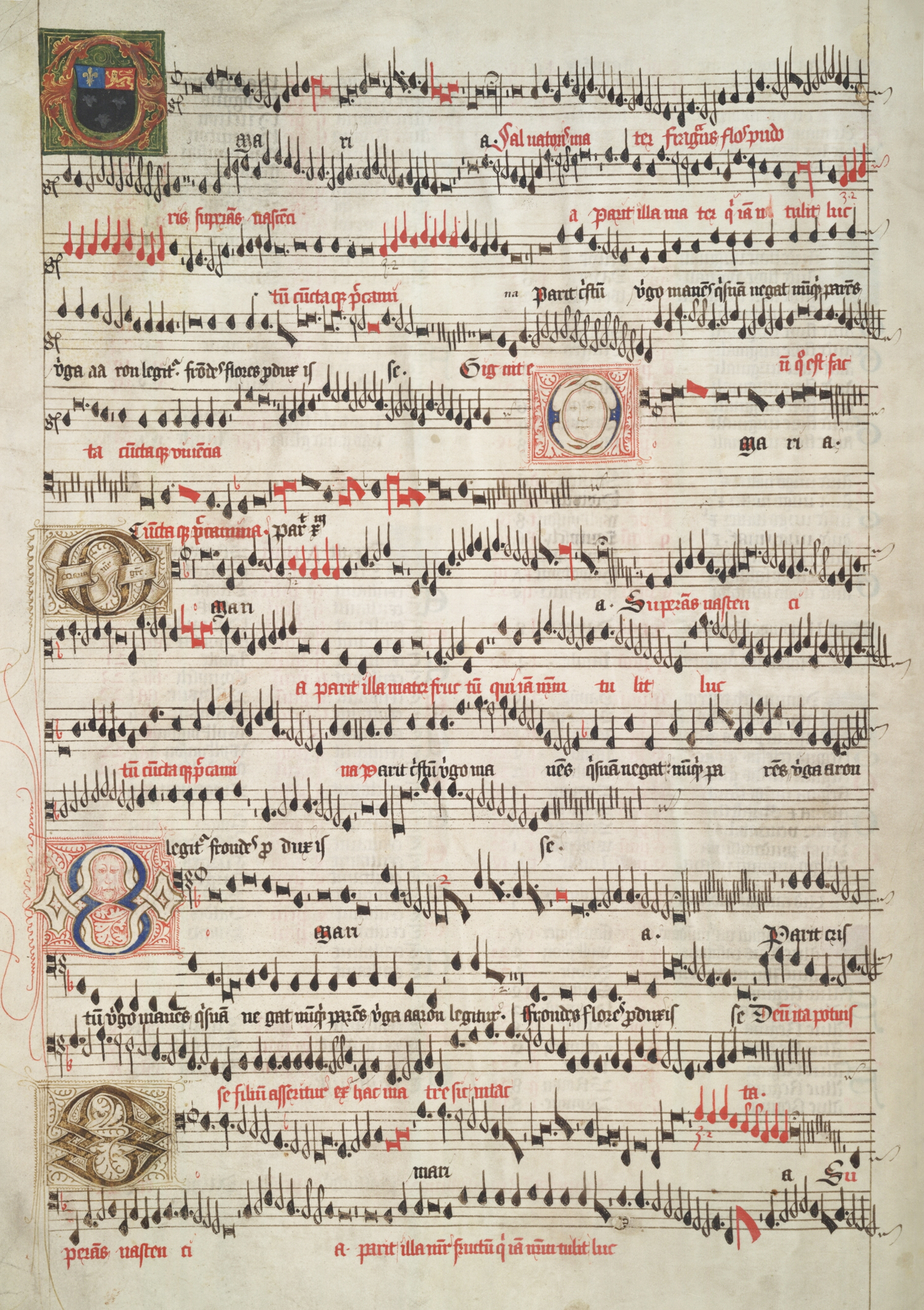
O Maria salvatoris, from the Eton Choirbook

A rota is a form of round, known to have been used from the thirteenth century in England. The earliest surviving piece of composed music in the British Isles, and perhaps the oldest recorded folk song in Europe, is a rota: a setting of 'Sumer Is Icumen In' ('Summer is a-coming in'), from the mid-thirteenth century, possibly written by W. de Wycombe, precentor of the priory of Leominster in Herefordshire, and set for six parts. Although few are recorded, the use of rotas seems to have been widespread in England and it has been suggested that the English talent for polyphony may have its origins in this form of music.

== Votive antiphons ==
Polyphonic votive antiphons emerged in England in the fourteenth century as a setting of a text honouring the Virgin Mary, but separate from the mass and office, often performed after compline. Towards the end of the fifteenth century they began to be written by English composers as expanded settings for as many as nine parts with increasing complexity and vocal range. The largest collection of such antiphons is in the late fifteenth century Eton choirbook.

== Carols ==
Coventry Carol
The Coventry Carol, performed by the U.S. Army Band Chorus.

The word carol is derived from the Old French word carole, a circle dance accompanied by singers (in turn derived from the Latin choraula). Carols were very popular as dance songs from the 1150s to the 1350s. Carols developed in the fourteenth century as a simple song, with a verse and refrain structure. Their use expanded as processional songs sung during festivals, particularly at Advent, Easter and Christmas, while others were written to accompany religious mystery plays (such as the Coventry Carol, written before 1534). Because the tradition of carols continued into the modern era, more is known of their structure and variety than most other secular forms of medieval music.

== Ballads ==
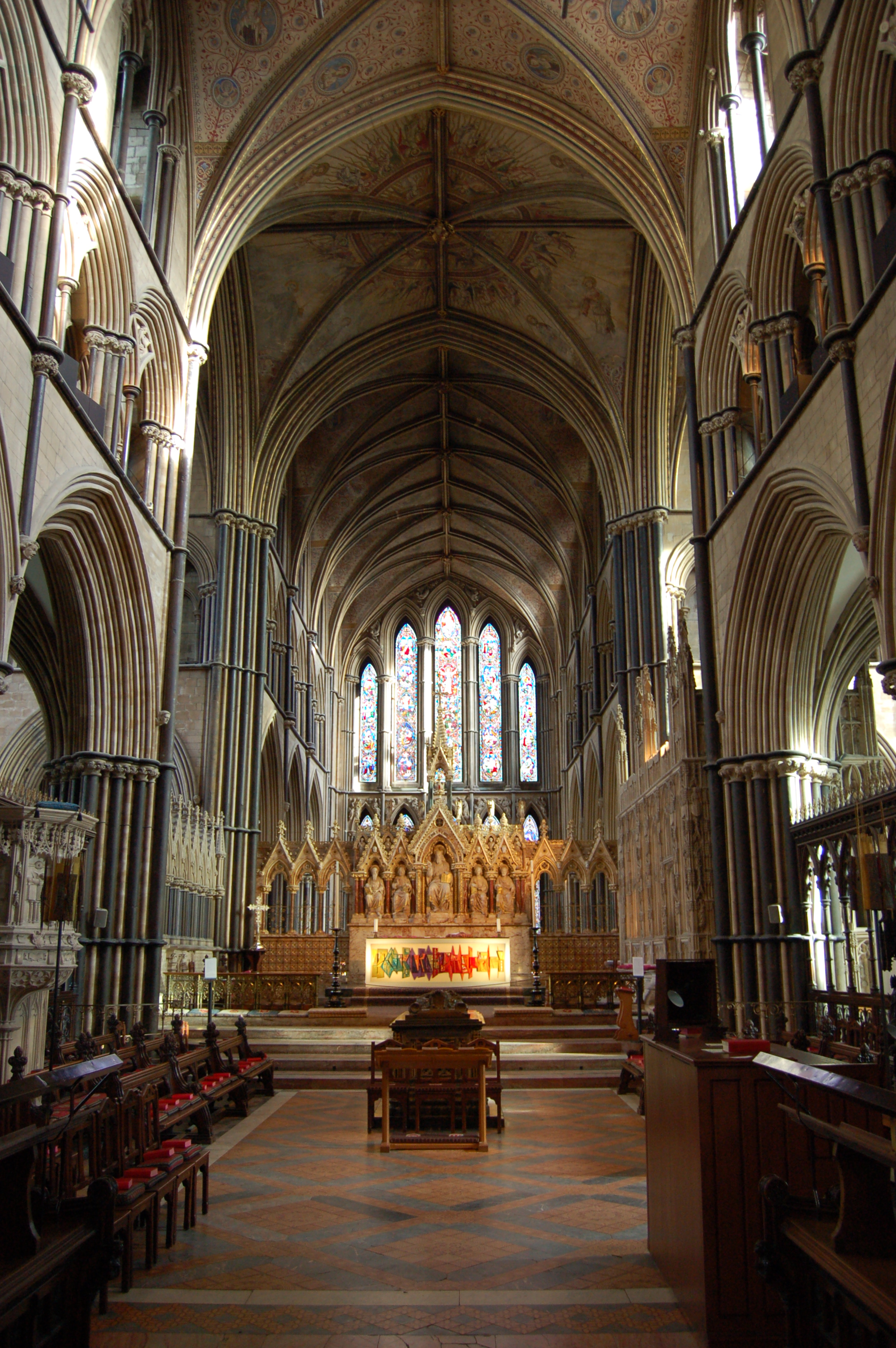
The east end of Worcester Cathedral, where Henry Abyngdon was Master of Music from 1465 to 1483

The traditional, classical or popular ballad has been seen as beginning with the wandering minstrels of late medieval Europe. As a narrative song, their theme and function may originate from Scandinavian and Germanic traditions of storytelling that can be seen in poems such as Beowulf. The earliest example of a recognisable ballad in form in England is "Judas" in a thirteenth-century manuscript. From the end of the fifteenth century there are printed ballads that suggest a rich tradition of popular music. A reference in William Langland's Piers Plowman indicates that ballads about Robin Hood were being sung from at least the late fourteenth century and the oldest detailed material is Wynkyn de Worde's collection of Robin Hood ballads printed about 1495. Early collections of English ballads were made by Samuel Pepys (1633–1703) and in the Roxburghe Ballads collected by Robert Harley, 1st Earl of Oxford and Mortimer (1661–1724). Increasing numbers were collected from the eighteenth century, some of which may date back to the medieval era.

== Renaissance c. 1450–c. 1500 ==
The impact of humanism on music can be seen in England the late fifteenth century under Edward IV (r. 1461–1483) and Henry VII (r. 1485–1509). Although the influence of English music on the continent declined from the mid-fifteenth century as the Burgundian School became the dominant force in the West, English music continued to flourish with the first composers being awarded doctorates at Oxford and Cambridge, including Thomas Santriste, who was provost of King's College, Cambridge, and Henry Abyngdon, who was Master of Music at Worcester Cathedral and from 1465 to 1483 Master of the King's Music. Edward IV chartered and patronised the first guild of musicians in London in 1472, a pattern copied in other major towns cities as musicians formed guilds or waites, creating local monopolies with greater organisation, but arguably ending the role of the itinerant minstrel. There were increasing numbers of foreign musicians, particularly those from France and the Netherlands, at the court, becoming a majority of those known to have been employed by the death of Henry VII. His mother, Lady Margaret Beaufort, was the major sponsor of music during his reign, commissioning several settings for new liturgical feasts and ordinary of the mass. The result was a very elaborate style which balanced the many parts of the setting and prefigured Renaissance developments elsewhere.

== See also ==
- Classical music of the United Kingdom
- Early music
- Music of the United Kingdom
