= Music of England =

Music of England may refer to:

- English folk music
- Music in Medieval England
- English art song

== See also ==
- Category:Classical music in England
- Music of the United Kingdom
  - British popular music
  - British rock music
  - British pop music
- Early music of the British Isles
- Baroque music of the British Isles
- Early British popular music
