= Lambie =

Lambie is a surname. Articles include:

- Ashton Lambie (born 1990), American cyclist
- Alex Lambie (1897–1963), Scottish footballer
- David Lambie (1925–2019), Scottish Labour Party politician
- Derek Lambie (born 1975), Scottish newspaper editor
- Duncan Lambie (born 1952), Scottish footballer
- George Lambie (1882–1965), American soccer football referee
- Jacqui Lambie (born 1971), Australian politician
- Jim Lambie (born 1964), Scottish installation artist
- John Lambie (engineer) (1833–1895), Scottish locomotive engineer
- John Lambie (footballer, born 1868), (1868–1923) Scottish footballer
- John Lambie (footballer, born 1940), Scottish football player and manager
- Patrick Lambie (born 1990), South African rugby union player
- Dr. Thomas Lambie (1885–1854), American medical missionary in Ethiopia
- William Lambie (footballer) (1873–?), Scottish footballer
- W. J. Lambie (William James Lambie, 1860–1900), Australian journalist killed in Boer War
- William Thomas Lambie (1837–1900), American civil engineer
- The Lamb Chop dog toy, which has been known colloquially as "Lambie".

== See also ==
- Lambie-Nairn
- Lambe
- Lammy (disambiguation)
- Lamby (disambiguation)
