= Antonius Romanus =

Italian composer

Antonius Romanus, sometimes referred to as Antonio Romano, (fl. 1400 – 1432) was an Italian composer of the early 15th century, the early quattrocento, in which musical styles was in transition between the late medieval era and early Renaissance.

Few details are known about his life. Judging from his name, he may have been from Rome, and several records show his activity as a singer at St. Mark's in Venice between 1420 and 1432. His music appears to have been strongly influenced by Johannes Ciconia, who died in 1412, and it also seems to have been an influence on the young Guillaume Dufay, who was in Italy during most of Antonius's later period of known activity.

Six sacred compositions and one secular piece by Antonius have survived. The three mass movements, two Glorias and a Credo, all for four voices, are influenced by Ciconia; the three motets, also for four voices, are isorhythmic. All three can be approximately dated. The first, Ducalis sedes/Stirps Mocenigo, can be dated to 1414 or 1415, since it is written in praise of Tommaso Mocenigo, who was elected doge of Venice in 1414. The second, Carminibus festos/O requies populi, was written for the doge Francesco Foscari, who assumed the post in 1423. He most likely wrote the last, Aurea flammigera, in praise of Gianfrancesco Gonzaga on his triumphant return from Milan in 1432. Antonius's single remaining secular composition is a ballata, Deh s'i t'amo con fede; only one voice survives from this composition, and it is without text.

The similarities in style of some of Antonius's music to Dufay's earliest works suggest that the two may have crossed paths, or at least known each other's works.

== References and further reading ==
- Albert Seay/David Fallows: "Antonius Romanus", Grove Music Online, ed. L. Macy (Accessed March 15, 2006), (subscription access)
- Albert Seay, "Antonius Romanus", The New Grove Dictionary of Music and Musicians, ed. Stanley Sadie. 20 vol. London, Macmillan Publishers Ltd., 1980. ISBN 1-56159-174-2 (Note: this article contains a works list absent in the online Grove article)
- Gustave Reese, Music in the Renaissance. New York, W.W. Norton & Co., 1954. ISBN 0-393-09530-4
