= Aleyn =

English composer

Aleyn (fl. c. 1400) was an English composer. Two of his works survive in the Old Hall Manuscript, one a Gloria (no. 8), the other a Sarum Agnus Dei discant (no. 3, Old Hall, no. 128), later scratched out, which is ascribed to W. Aleyn. If this inscription is correct, the conflation of this composer and Johannes Alanus, who wrote Sub Arturo Plebs, is incorrect. David Fallows ascribed this Agnus to W. Typp, however it seems that he was mistaken.
