= Lionel Powers =

Lionel Powers may refer to:

- Gabriel Byrne's character in Weapons of Mass Distraction
- Leonel Power, early 15th-century composer
