= Johannes Alanus =

English composer (fl. late 14th or early 15th century)

Johannes Alanus (fl. late 14th or early 15th century) was an English composer. He wrote the motet Sub arturo plebs/Fons citharizancium/In omnem terram. Also attributed to him are the songs "Min frow, min frow" and "Min herze wil all zit frowen pflegen", both lieds, and "S'en vos por moy pitié ne truis", a virelai. O amicus/Precursoris, attributed simply to "Johannes", may be the work of the same composer.

== Identity ==
As with many medieval composers, there is some confusion as to Alanus's identity. For the composer represented in the Old Hall Manuscript, who has sometimes been conflated with Johannes Alanus, see Aleyn. The composer of Sub Arturo plebs, is identified as Jo.Alani and referring to J.Alani Minimus. He has been identified with Dominus Johannes Aleyn (or John Aleyn), who was a chaplain for the chapel of Edward III of England and later Canon of St George's Chapel at Windsor Castle from 1362 until his death in 1373. He received many other favors which indicate royal patronage, probably from Queen Philippa of Hainault.

== Sub Arturo plebs ==
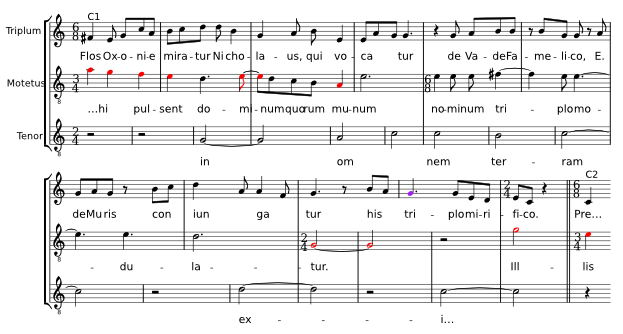
Part C1 (the first rhythmic unit of the third, diminished, repetition of the tenor) of the isorhythmic motet Sub arturo plebs - Fons citharizantium - In omnem terram, by Johannes Alanus, 14th century. After editions by Margaret Bent and Ursula Günther.

Sub Arturo plebs/Fons citharizancium/In omnem terram is an ars nova mensuration motet with a different text in each voice. The "triplum", or third voice, is on a text which names 14 musicians. These mentions, in some cases, are the sole extant references to these active musicians. Brian Trowell has identified many of those named with royal households. There has been significant debate as to the dating of this motet. The earliest dating assumes that it was written for the 1349 founding of the Order of the Garter, this date suggested by Trowell. Roger Bowers suggests that the list of musicians includes musicians who were no longer active at the time of the writing. Margaret Bent and others argue for a later date because of the style of the music itself, which includes a complex structure with three levels of diminution and rhythmic overlapping. This later dating, however, does not fall in with the theory that the composer is the same as the chaplain Johannes Aleyn. A certain date earlier than 1370 for this work would lead to a change in accepted ideas about the mid-14th-century style.

=== Composers mentioned ===
All the named musicians which have been identified were active in the English Chapel Royal between 1340 and 1405 or in the chapel of Edward the Black Prince. Below are some of the musicians as named in Sub Arturo plebs along with possible alternate names.

- Richard Blich maybe Richard Blithe
- J. Oxonia maybe J. Excetre
- G. Martini maybe Martyn or Gilbert Martyn
- J. de Alto Bosco maybe John Hanboys
- Edmundus de Buria maybe Edmund
- J. de Corbe or John de Corby

== Sources ==
- Fallows, David (2001). "Alanus, Johannes". Grove Music Online. Oxford: Oxford University Press. doi:10.1093/gmo/9781561592630.article.00402. ISBN 978-1-56159-263-0. (subscription, Wikilibrary access, or UK public library membership required)
