= Queldryk =

Queldryk (also Qweldryk) (fl. c. 1400) was an English composer. He is thought to have been associated with a similarly named estate (Wheldrake) of the Cistercian monastery of Fountains Abbey in Yorkshire. He may have been the Richard Queldryk who donated a miscellanea volume of sacred music to Lichfield Cathedral.

His known surviving output comprises two pieces in the Old Hall Manuscript, a Gloria and a Credo.
