= Lamby =

Lamby may refer to:

- API Lamby, a motor scooter by Automobile Products of India
- Dick Lamby (Richard A. Lamby, born 1955), American ice hockey player
- Iwan Lamby (1885–1970), Swedish sailor
- Lamby, nickname of English cricketer Allan Lamb
- Lamb Chop (puppet), nicknamed "Lambie" or "Lamby"

== See also ==
- Lambie, a surname
- Lammy (disambiguation)
- Lambretta, a brand of motor scooters
