= Damett =

English composer (1389/90–1436/70)

(Thomas?) Damett (?1389–1390 — between 15 July 1436 and 14 April 1437) was an English composer during the stylistic transitional from medieval to Renaissance music.

== Identity and career ==
The illegitimate son of a gentleman, he was a commoner at Winchester College until 1406–7 and became rector of Stockton, Wiltshire, in 1413. His name appears occasionally in the Royal Household Chapel accounts between 1413 and 1430–31. He was also prebendary of Rugmere in St Paul's Cathedral 1418–1436, was appointed to the fifth stall in St George's Chapel, Windsor Castle in 1431 and held the canonry until 1436.

== Music ==
Nine works by him survive in the Old Hall Manuscript and may be autographs: six mass movements (including a Gloria-Credo pair based on a Square) and three motets (one isorhythmic).

== Works ==
List of compositions by Damett
Title	No. of voices	Genre	Manuscript source
Credo	3	Mass movement	OH No. 39
Gloria	3	Mass movement	OH No. 93
Gloria	3	Mass movement	OH No. 10
Gloria	3	Mass movement	OH No. 13
Gloria	3	Mass movement	OH No. 37
Credo	3	Mass movement	OH No. 72
Beata Dei genitrix	3	Psalm antiphon	OH No. 53
Salve porta paradisi	3	Sequence	OH No. 54
Salvatoris mater pia/O Georgi/Benedictus qui ve-	3	Sequence	OH No. 111
No other works by Damett survive

=== Editions ===
- Hughes, Andrew; Bent, Margaret, eds. (1969–1973). The Old Hall Manuscript. Corpus mensurabilis musicae 53. Cambridge: American Institute of Musicology. OCLC 80858118.
- Ramsbotham, Alexander, ed. (1933–1938). The Old Hall Manuscript. Vol. 3 volumes. Completed by H.B. Collins and Dom Anselm Hughes. Buckinghamshire: Plainsong and Medieval Music Society.
