= Byttering =

English composer (fl. 1410–1420)

Byttering (also Bytering, Bytteryng, or Biteryng; fl. c. 1400–1420) was an English composer during the stylistic transitional from medieval to Renaissance music. Five of his compositions have survived in the Old Hall Manuscript, where the musicologist Peter Wright contends they "form a small yet distinctive corpus of work notable for its technical ambition and musical accomplishment".

== Identity and career ==
Extremely little is known of Byttering, whose name is variously spelled as Bytering, Bytteryng, and Biteryng. The musicologist Margaret Bent has suggested he was Thomas Byteryng, though his identity remains uncertain. Byteryng was a canon at Hastings Castle between 1405 and 1408, and was a rector somewhere in London in 1414.

There is no information on the composer in the Old Hall Manuscript other than that his surname is attached to several pieces. Those pieces stand out from many of the works in the manuscript by their relatively advanced stylistic traits.

== Music ==
Byttering's surviving music includes five compositions: three mass sections—two Glorias and a Credo—a motet and an antiphon. The latter, Nesciens Mater, is "famous for its remarkable camouflaging of the plainsong by means of transposition and migration". His motet is a substantial three-voice isorhythmic piece and his best known work, En Katerine solennia/Virginalis contio/Sponsus amat sponsum; it was almost certainly written for the wedding, on 2 June 1420, of King Henry V and Catherine of Valois.

The four-voice Gloria, No. 18 in the Old Hall MS, is one of the most complex canons of the early 15th century, and represents what was probably the extreme of stylistic differentiation between English and continental practice. Canons in continental sources are extremely rare, but there are seven in the Old Hall MS, and Byttering's is the only one with the standard arrangement of the same tune in all four voices.

== Works ==
List of compositions by Byttering
Title	No. of voices	Genre	Manuscript source
Credo	3	Mass movement	OH No. 79
Gloria	3	Mass movement	OH No. 17
Gloria	4	Mass movement	OH No. 18
Nesciens mater	3	Antiphon	OH No. 50
En Katerine solennia/Virginalis contio/Sponsus amat sponsum	3	Motet	OH No. 145
No other works by Byttering survive

=== Editions ===
- Hughes, Andrew; Bent, Margaret, eds. (1969–1973). The Old Hall Manuscript. Corpus mensurabilis musicae 53. Cambridge: American Institute of Musicology. OCLC 80858118.
- Ramsbotham, Alexander, ed. (1933–1938). The Old Hall Manuscript. Vol. 3 volumes. Completed by H.B. Collins and Dom Anselm Hughes. Buckinghamshire: Plainsong and Medieval Music Society.
