= Albert Seay =

American musicologist (1916–1984)

- Born: November 9, 1916; Louisville, Kentucky, US
- Died: January 7, 1984 (aged 67); Colorado Springs, Colorado, US
- Known for: Critical editions on the works of early composers and theorists

Academic background
- Education: Murray College; Louisiana State University; Yale University

Academic work
- Discipline: Medieval and Renaissance music and theory
- Institutions: Colorado College; South-Western Louisiana Institute

Albert Seay (November 9, 1916 – January 7, 1984) was an American musicologist who specialized in medieval and Renaissance music and theory. His publications included critical editions of works by the composers Jacques Arcadelt and Carpentras, and the theorists John Hothby, Johannes Tinctoris and Ugolino of Orvieto.

== Life and career ==
Albert Seay was born on November 9, 1916, in Louisville, Kentucky. In 1937, he received both a Bachelor of Arts and Bachelor of Music at Murray State University. After receiving a Master of Music from Louisiana State University (1939), Seay briefly taught at the South-Western Louisiana Institute from 1946 to 1949. He continued his education at Yale University receiving a PhD in 1954 after studies with Leo Schrade. From 1953 until his retirement in 1982, Seay was on the faculty of Colorado College. Seay died in Colorado Springs, Colorado on January 7, 1984. The music library of Colorado College, is named for Seay: the Seay Library of Music and Art.

Seay chiefly specialized in the music and theory of medieval music and Renaissance music. He edited many critical editions of musicians from these periods, including the compositions of both Jacques Arcadelt and Carpentras, as well as the theoretical writings of John Hothby, Johannes Tinctoris and Ugolino of Orvieto. He was associated with American Institute of Musicology and served as editor of the Colorado College Music Press Series.

== Selected writings ==
Books

- Seay, Albert (1954). The 'Declaratio musicae disciplinae' of Ugolino of Orvieto (PhD). Yale University. OCLC 54185759.
- —— (1965). Music in the Medieval World. Englewood Cliffs: Prentice Hall.

Articles

- Seay, Albert (Summer 1955). "The "Dialogus Johannis Ottobi Anglici in arte musica"". Journal of the American Musicological Society. 8 (2): 86–100. doi:10.2307/830210. JSTOR 830210.
- —— (1955). "Ugolino of Orvieto, Theorist and Composer". Musica Disciplina. 9: 111–166. ISSN 0077-2461. JSTOR 20531891.

Editions

- Seay, Albert, ed. (1979). Sonate da camera: Opus 4, for two violins and basso continuo. Musica da camera, 55. Oxford: Oxford University Press. ISBN 978-0-19-357620-9.
