= Nicholas Sturgeon =

English priest and composer (ca. 1380s-1454)

Nicholas Sturgeon (ca. 1380s – between 31 May and 8 June 1454) was a Canon of Windsor from 1442 to 1454, a composer and a compiler of the Old Hall Manuscript.

== Career ==
Sturgeon was educated at Winchester College, where he was elected a scholar in 1399, and New College, Oxford. He accompanied King Henry V as chaplain whilst on campaign in France in 1415. He held several canonries, and served as a member of the Royal House Chapel.

He was appointed:

- Rector of Fulham 1439 - 1452
- Rector of Allerton, Somerset
- Rector of Wraxall, Somerset
- Rector of Avening, Worcestershire
- Custos of the Free Chapel, near Weare (Allerton)
- Prebendary of Reculverland in St Paul's 1440 - 1452
- Prebendary of Kentish Town in St Paul's 1452 - 1454
- Precentor of St Paul's Cathedral 1442 - 1454
- Prebendary of Hasilbury in Wells
- Prebendary of Exeter

He was appointed to the eighth stall in St George's Chapel, Windsor Castle in 1442 and held the canonry until 1454.
