= Lammy =

Lammy may refer to:

- David Lammy (born 1972), British Labour MP
- Lambda Literary Awards, also known as the "Lammys"
- Lammy, protagonist in video game Um Jammer Lammy
- Lammy, a Happy Tree Friends character

== See also ==
- Lamby (disambiguation)
