= Lambe =

Lambe is a surname, and may refer to:

- Alice Marie Lambe (c. 1850–1933), British social reformer
- Anna Lambe, Canadian actress
- Charles Lambe (1900–1960), Royal Navy admiral
- Charles Laverock Lambe (1875–1953), Royal Air Force air marshal
- Claire Lambe (artist) (born 1962), English-born Australian artist
- John Lambe (c. 1545 – 1628), English astrologer
- John Lambe (M5 rapist) (born 1944), English criminal
- Lawrence Lambe (1863–1919), Canadian palaeontologist
- Lisa Lambe (born 1984), Irish singer and performer
- Reggie Lambe (born 1991), Bermudian professional footballer
- Robert Lambe (author) (1711–1795), English Anglican priest and writer

Lambe is also the name of a letter in the Tengwar script.

== See also ==
- Lamb (surname)
- Lambie
