= Walter Frye =

English composer

Walter Frye (ob. 1474?) was an English composer of vocal music of the early Renaissance whose best known composition is Ave Regina.

== Life ==
Nothing certain is known about his life. He may have been a "Walter Cantor" at Ely Cathedral between 1443 and 1466, and he may have been the Walter Frye who joined the London Parish Clerks in 1456. Additionally, he may have been the Walter Frye who left a will at Canterbury in 1474.

== Music ==
Most of Frye's music survives in manuscripts from the continent, which has suggested to scholars that he spent much of his time there; however stylistically his music is closer to that of other English composers (such as John Dunstaple and John Hothby) than to that of the Burgundian School, the most notable contemporary movement on the continent. A reason sometimes given for the survival of his music in continental sources is that the few remaining English 15th-century manuscripts rarely mention the names of composers; therefore there may be a good deal of his music which is simply anonymous. Survival of music from the period in England is sparse because most of it was destroyed during the dissolution of the Monasteries carried out between 1536 and 1540 by Henry VIII.

Frye wrote masses, motets and songs, including ballades and a single rondeau. All of his surviving music is vocal, and his best-known composition is an Ave Regina, a motet which occurs, unusually, in three contemporary paintings, even including notation. Some of his shorter pieces acquired an extraordinary fame in far-away areas, such as Italy, southern Germany, Bohemia and present-day Austria, including the rondeau Tout a par moy and the ballade So ys emprentid. These songs were often copied, rearranged and plagiarized, and appear in numerous collections in varied forms.

Frye's masses, however, were his most historically significant contribution, for they influenced the music of Jacob Obrecht and Antoine Busnois. Frye's style in his masses was typical of English music of the period, the Contenance Angloise, using full triadic sonorities, and sometimes isorhythmic techniques; he contrasted full-voiced textures with passages for only two voices, which became a characteristic sound of the polyphony of the late 15th and early 16th centuries. Three masses have survived more or less complete: the Missa Flos Regalis (for four voices), Missa Nobilis et Pulchra (three voices), and the Missa Summe Trinitati (also for three voices).
