= Carpentras (composer) =

French composer

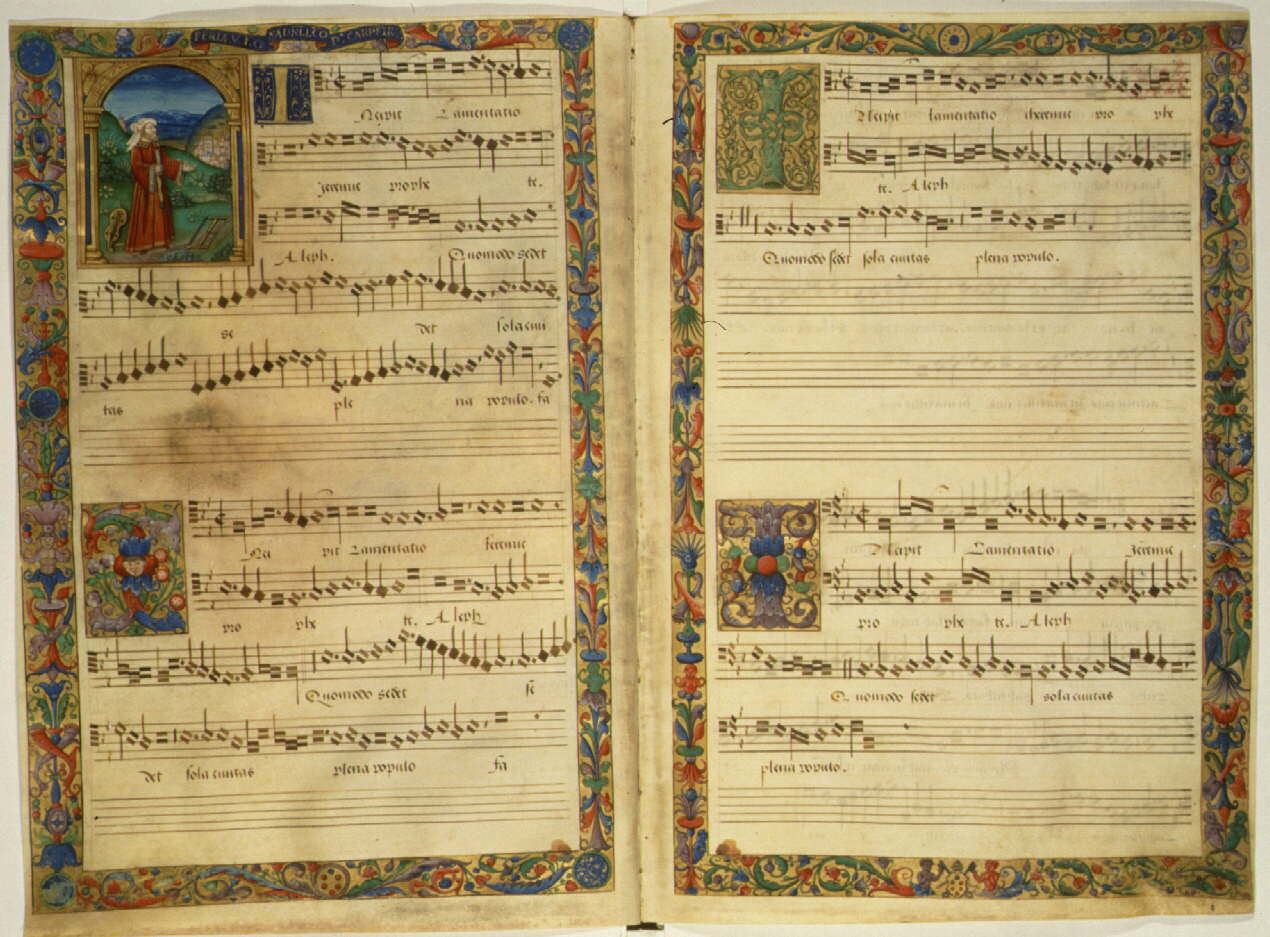
Parchment manuscript showing the polyphonic setting by Carpentras of the Lamentations of Jeremiah. This was presented to Pope Clement VII around 1524.

Carpentras (also Elzéar Genet, Eliziari Geneti) (ca. 1470 – June 14, 1548) was a French composer of the Renaissance. He was famous during his lifetime, and was especially notable for his settings of the Lamentations which remained in the repertory of the Papal Choir throughout the 16th century. In addition, he was probably the most prominent Avignon musician since the time of the ars subtilior at the end of the 14th century.

== Life ==
He was born in the town of Carpentras, but nothing else is known about his early life. Sometime before 1505, he took ecclesiastical orders, since when he was hired in the Avignon chapel in that year he was called "clericus." He spent most of his life alternately in Avignon and Rome.

Evidently he was acquainted with Avignon bishop Giuliano della Rovere, for when the bishop became Pope Julius II Carpentras went with him to Rome, where he sang in the papal chapel; he was listed in a roll of the singers there in 1508. However, after a few years he left the chapel to work at the court of Louis XII of France, though little is known about him at this time; clearly he was composing large quantities of secular music, some of it quite irreverent, for when he returned to Rome in 1513 he specifically promised to stop writing it. He became master of the papal chapel in 1514, now under the Medici Pope Leo X, who was an enthusiastic patron of music and the arts. When Leo X died in 1521, Carpentras fled Rome for Avignon; the new pope Adrian VI was uninterested in music, if not actively hostile, and many musicians gave him a "walking ovation."

When Adrian VI died in 1523, the new pope, Clement VII, was again a fine patron of the arts, and Carpentras returned to Rome. While there he was surprised to discover his own music still being sung but in bastardized versions; as a result he carefully copied over some of his music, such as the pictured setting of the Lamentations of Jeremiah, and presented this collection to Clement VII as the "true" or "corrected" version. However, he did not stay in Rome, and after only two years he departed for Avignon, this time for good.

In 1526 he became afflicted with tinnitus, a condition which terrified him, and which he described as a continuous hissing in his head. Apparently it was at this time that he withdrew from practical music-making and instead decided to devote himself to publishing his entire output of sacred music, an immense undertaking, and the earliest recorded such attempt in music history. The publication was troublesome; one of the printers failed to align the notes to staves correctly, and the entire process ended in arbitration at one point: however eventually, in the mid 1530s, he was able to issue four large collections of his music. Two of the volumes he dedicated to Pope Clement VII, and the other two to Cardinal Ippolito de'Medici.

He seems to have held several ecclesiastical positions in Avignon in the last two decades of his life, including the deanship of St. Agricole, where he died in 1548. Cardano reports that his excessive dedication to composition undermined his sanity, cautioning his readers that '"you must take care not to work with such excessive mental strain that you become insane… for it said that when the musician Carpentras labored too strongly in the art (to which the pope was very devoted), that he lost his reason'.

== Works ==
Carpentras composed several masses, numerous settings of the Magnificat, psalm settings, hymns, motets, and secular songs, as well as many settings of the Lamentations, which were his most famous work both during his lifetime and until 1587 when Palestrina was commissioned by the Counter-Reformation church to replace them. Stylistically, his music is typical of the generation after Josquin, smoothly polyphonic with pervasive imitation. Carpentras alternates points of imitation with homophonic sections, especially in his settings of the Lamentations.

== Sources and further reading ==
- Article "Carpentras", in The New Grove Dictionary of Music and Musicians, ed. Stanley Sadie. 20 vol. London, Macmillan Publishers Ltd., 1980. ISBN 1-56159-174-2
- Howard Mayer Brown, Richard Scherr: "Carpentras", Grove Music Online ed. L. Macy (Accessed July 13, 2005), (subscription access)
- Gustave Reese, Music in the Renaissance. New York, W.W. Norton & Co., 1954. ISBN 0-393-09530-4
- Harold Gleason and Warren Becker, Music in the Middle Ages and Renaissance (Music Literature Outlines Series I). Bloomington, Indiana. Frangipani Press, 1986. ISBN 0-89917-034-X
