= Roy Henry =

British composer

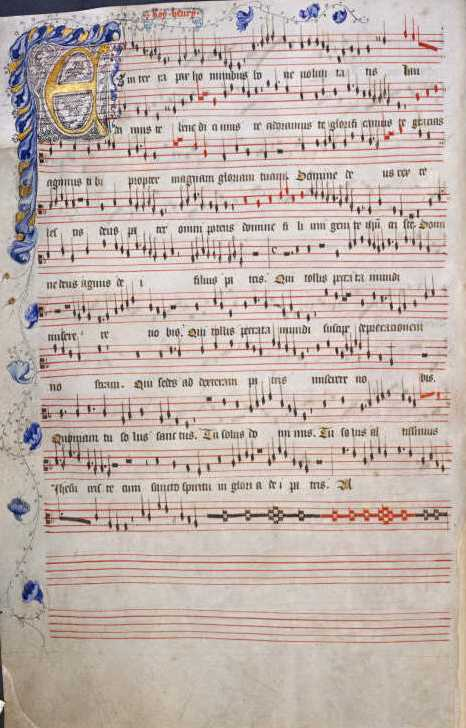
A setting of the Gloria by Roy Henry: Folio 12v of the Old Hall Manuscript.

Roy Henry ("King" Henry) (fl. c. 1410) was an English composer, almost certainly the pseudonym of an English King: probably Henry V, but also possibly Henry IV. His music, two compositions in all, appears in a position of prominence in the Old Hall Manuscript.

== Identity ==
Musicologists have not been able to agree on which English monarch wrote the two mass movements which appear, at the head of their respective sections, in the Old Hall Manuscript. Henry IV, who reigned from 1399 to 1413, was in his early forties when the music was most likely written, since stylistic evidence places it around 1410. However, by 1410 Henry IV was suffering from a disfiguring disease and struggling to maintain his regal power. Therefore, it is unlikely that he, albeit a talented musician, could be the composer of the two pieces. Whereas Henry V, despite being extremely 'busy on campaigns' after his succession, was recorded to never have ceased in his fondness for music. In 1420 the Pell Rolls recorded payments for two new harps to be shipped to the King in France. And the King even went so far as to take his chapel to the Agincourt campaign. This, as well as being substantial evidence for his piety, suggests that the latter is the composer.

Henry V, who reigned from 1413 to 1422, was known to have cultivated music in his youth. Payment for a harp along with 'swords and books on Latin verses' for the young lord Henry was recorded when he was merely six years old. An early biography of Henry V states:

…he was in his youth a diligent follower of idle practices, much given to instruments of music, and fired with the torches of Venus herself. Recent research has shown that work on the Old Hall Manuscript probably ceased on the death of Thomas, Duke of Clarence, in 1421. And the last piece of music in the Manuscript was doubtlessly written for the wedding of Henry and Catherine. Since Thomas was King Henry V's brother, and his chapel's musicians are now known to have included Leonel Power, and the manuscript itself passed to Henry V's chapel on the death of Thomas, and the composers included some members of the King's Royal Chapel, most notably John Dunstable. Obviously the manuscript could not have been passed to the long-dead Henry IV at this time, yet this is not a conclusive argument. Henry V's extraordinary piety - outdoing even his father in matters of religion - is consistent with the composition of sacred music, and we can be sure of his musical education. It is impossible to say for certain which man was the composer without further evidence.

== Music ==
Roy Henry's music consists of two movements of the ordinary of the mass: a Gloria and a Sanctus, both for three voices, and written in a fairly low register. The music itself is skillfully written, and unusually for the time, no specific plainchant can be identified as a source; both pieces may be freely composed, or the underlying chant may be part of the enormous lost repertory of music from the early 15th century, hence unidentifiable (the vast majority of manuscripts of the time were destroyed in the 1530s during Henry VIII's Dissolution of the Monasteries).
