= Waites =

Waites is a surname. Notable people with the surname include:

- Addie Waites Hunton (1866–1943), American activist
- Aline Waites, English actress
- Brian Waites (1940–2025), English golfer
- Cole Waites (born 1998), American baseball player
- George Waites (1938–2000), English footballer
- Harry Waites, English football coach
- Keisha Waites (born 1972), American politician
- Luigi Waites (1927–2010), American jazz drummer and vibraphonist
- Margaret C. Waites (1883–1923), American classical scholar and college professor
- Richard Waites (1951–2016), American psychologist
- Scott Waites (born 1977), English darts player
- Thomas G. Waites (born 1955), American actor
