= Old Hall Manuscript =

Primary source material for Medieval English choral music

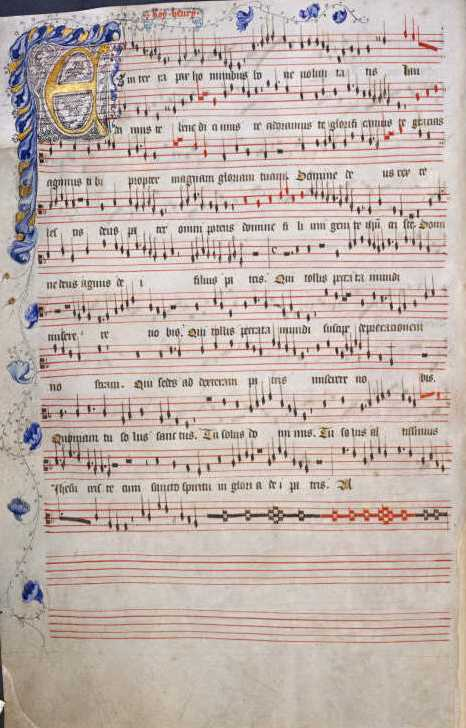
Folio 12v of the Old Hall Manuscript contains the decorated opening to a Gloria by Roy Henry (probably King Henry V).

The Old Hall Manuscript (British Library, Add MS 57950) is the largest, most complete, and most significant source of English sacred music of the late 14th and early 15th centuries, and as such represents the best source for late Medieval English music. The manuscript somehow survived the Reformation, and formerly belonged to St Edmund's College, a Roman Catholic school located at Old Hall Green (hence its name) in Hertfordshire. It was sold to the British Library after an auction at Sotheby's in 1973.

== Overview ==
The manuscript contains 148 compositions overall, 77 of which are written in score rather than in separate parts. Most of the pieces are settings of parts of the ordinary of the Mass, and are grouped by section. In other words, the settings of the Gloria are together, as are the settings of the Credo, Sanctus, and Agnus Dei. Between these grouped settings are some motets and pieces related to the conductus. The beginning of the manuscript is now lost, therefore the settings of the Mass ordinary begin with the Gloria rather than the Kyrie; the omission of such settings is most probably due to historical accident, although Howard M. Brown notes that many English cyclic Masses lacked Kyries and the English generally preferred their settings of the respective texts separate to the rest of the Mass.

The Old Hall Manuscript was compiled in the early 15th century, probably over a period of about 20 years. The hands of several copyists are identifiable, and some of them may be those of the composers themselves. Recent research has suggested that work on the manuscript ended with the death of Thomas, Duke of Clarence, in 1421, a somewhat later date than was previously suggested. This date allows the fitting into the chronology of the most recent piece in the manuscript, the wedding motet by Byttering which was almost certainly written for the marriage of Henry V and Catherine of Valois on 2 June 1420, as well as a group of motets by several composers, the titles of which closely match written accounts of the music played at the celebration of the victory of Agincourt in 1415.

== Notation ==
The notation of the manuscript is generally split between score notation and each vocal part written out separately. The former was already out-of-date by the time of the manuscript's compilation, whereas the latter, known as cantus collateralis, had become largely standardized outside of England. It utilized the more conventional "choirbook format", in which two voices (one above the other) are placed on the left-hand side and vice versa when the composition was written as four-part harmony. These differences in notation techniques are heavily reflective of the Old Hall Manuscript's diversity of styles, as the cantus collateralis tradition was already the standard on the Continent (particularly in France and Italy).

== Musical styles and techniques ==
Various musical styles and techniques are represented including English discant, treble-dominated works, isorhythmic compositions, and canons. A complex Credo (No. 75 in the manuscript) includes a three-voice mensuration canon among its five voices; it is notated in black, red and blue notes.

The Old Hall Manuscript is significant for confirming the existence and character of specifically English musical traits, the extent of the development of English music, as well as the influence of continental practices. In particular it shows a tendency in England to focus on musical complexities, such as canons, at a time when music on the continent was increasingly tending towards simplicity. Whether this trend generally continued in the 15th century in England is hard to determine because of the poor survival of manuscripts from that time, but it was well established by the middle of the 15th century, for example at the Burgundian court, that there was a style which was identifiably English—"la contenance angloise", according to Martin le Franc in his poem of 1441–1442 Le Champion des Dames. On the other hand, the Old Hall Manuscript is an impressive example of French influence in England. Manfred Bukofzer, writing in Studies in Medieval and Renaissance Music (1950) wrote: "The greatest surprise of the Old Hall Repertory is unquestionably the prominent role of isorhythmic technique, which is irrefutable proof of a strong French influence." As English musicians were well known at the Burgundian court, French musicians may also have been known in England. It has been suggested that Pycard, composer of the canon No. 75, was actually French; but this is unlikely on stylistic grounds.

The Old Hall is also a major representative of the chanson, in which the upper voice(s) moving with more fluidity and added ornamentation as opposed to the uniformity of the lower counterparts. Despite the obvious French connections, the chansons of the Old Hall Manuscript are in no way restricted to any one style and indeed many international composers utilized the form as well from the 14th century onwards. (Note: For specific examples of music based on geographic location, see Ars nova, Music of the Trecento, Geisslerlieder and Contenance angloise.)

The influence of the Low Countries may be discerned in the music of Oliver.

One feature of the repertoire is the cultivation of dissonance, comparable perhaps to the music in the Cyprus Manuscript of a couple of decades later. Good examples can be heard in the music of John Cooke and Damett.

A historically significant development was the occasional use of divisi, the earliest certain evidence of polyphony being sung by a choir of two or more voices per part.

== Composers represented ==
Composers with works in the Old Hall Manuscript include Leonel Power, Pycard, William Typp, Thomas Byttering, Oliver, Chirbury, Excetre, John Cooke, Roy Henry (probably King Henry V, but possibly King Henry IV), Queldryk, John Tyes, Aleyn, Fonteyns, Gervays, Lambe, Nicholas Sturgeon, Thomas Damett, and others. The manuscript also contains some works by foreign musicians, including Antonio Zachara da Teramo and Mayshuet.

== Scholarly editions ==
The Old Hall manuscript [by] A. Ramsbotham. Nashdom Abbey : Plainsong & Mediaeval Music Soc., 1933.

The Old Hall manuscript transcribed and edited by Andrew Hughes and Margaret Bent. Dallas (Tex.): American Institute of Musicology, 1969-1973. (Corpus mensurabilis musicae; 46)
