= Henry Abyngdon =

Henry Abyngdon, Abingdon or Abington (c. 1418 – 1 September 1497) was an English ecclesiastic and musician, perhaps the first to receive a university degree in music.

== Biography ==
He may have been connected with the village of Abington in Cambridgeshire. As a cleric at Eton College in 1444 he received a life annuity from Humphrey, Duke of Gloucester, and was a member of the household chapel of the Duke from 1445 to 1447. He then succeeded John Bernard as succentor of Wells Cathedral on 24 November 1447 (holding that post until his death) and was a canon from 1458. He was admitted a Bachelor of Music at Cambridge on 22 February 1463, this being the first musical degree recorded at any university. In addition to the succentorship at Wells, Abyngdon held the office of Master of the Children of the Chapel Royal in London, to which he was appointed in May 1465 at an annual salary of forty marks, confirmed to him by a subsequent Act of Parliament in 1473–74. He was also made Master of St. Catherine's Hospital, Bedminster, Bristol, in 1478.

== Reputation ==
He is said to have been pre-eminent both as a singer and an organist, although none of his works are known to have survived. Two Latin epitaphs on Abyngdon by Sir Thomas More have been preserved. In these he himself is styled "nobilis", and his office in London "cantor". One of them calls him

The best singer among thousands,
and besides this the best organist too.
(Millibus in mille cantor fuit optimus ille,
Praeter et haec ista fuit optimus orgaquenista.)
