= John Hanboys =

English music theorist

John Hanboys, also John Hamboys and possibly J. de Alto Bosco (fl. 1370), was a medieval musical theorist from England.

== Biography ==
Very little is known of the life of Hanboys. He may have come from one of the villages of Little or Great Hautboys in Norfolk. In the attribution of one version of the treatise Summa super musicam he is called 'doctoris musice reverendi'. It has been assumed that because he was called 'reverend', may have been a monk or friar, but this uncertain. Traditionally authors followed the earliest biographical source John Bale's Illustrium maioris britanniae scriptorum (Summary of the Writers of Britain) (1548), which uses the spelling 'Hamboys' and indicates he received a liberal education from an early age, but was chiefly devoted to the study of music. That he was eloquent and accomplished, and after studying for many years in 'the school of his land' he was given the degree of doctor of music. He adds that he was 'the most noted man of his day in England' and that he came to prominence in 1470 in the reign of Edward IV (r.1461-83). If he did hold a doctorate of music it was probably one of the first from Oxford or Cambridge, although the common assertion in older literature that it was the first held from Oxford is not clear from the sources, and Bale may simply be expanding his biography from the title 'doctoris musice', which could be read as 'learned in music'. More recently Brian Trowell has argued that he can be identified with J. de Alto Bosco, the Latin title of a musician mentioned in the motet Sub Arturo plebs, which is probably from a century earlier, in the 1370s. It is possible that Bale only knew the Summa from a later edition and so may have assumed the period of authorship to fit with that or he may have conflating him with fifteenth-century composer and theorist John Hothby (d. 1487).

== Work and influence ==
Following Bale, Hanboys is traditionally identified as the author of a (now unknown) volume of music and, more securely, of an important musical treatise Summa super musicam continuam et discretam, a theoretical work on music that discusses the origins of musical notation and mensuration from the thirteenth century and proposes several new methods for recording music. It discusses the differences between the ars antiqua and developing ars nova styles of music and proposes the expansion of the mensural system to a total of eight figures.
