= Simon Tunsted =

English Franciscan friar and writer on music

Simon Tunsted (c. 1310 – 1369) was an English Franciscan friar, theologian, philosopher and musician. The authorship of Quatuor Principalia Musicae, a treatise on music, is generally attributed to him.

He originated from Norwich, though his year of birth is unknown. In Norwich, he joined a Greyfriars monastery and became a doctor of theology. He went on to become master of the Minorites at Oxford (in 1351). He died at Bruisyard, Suffolk. He was twenty-ninth provincial superior of the Minorites in England.

== Works ==
Tunsted wrote a commentary on the Meteorologica of Aristotle and improved the calculating device described by Richard of Wallingford in Tractatus Albionis. He is also usually credited as the author of the Quatuor Principalia Musicae, a mediaeval treatise on music which set out the musical principles on which the Ars nova movement was based.
