= Sub Arturo plebs =

Sub Arturo plebs – Fons citharizantium – In omnem terram is an isorhythmic motet of the second part of the 14th century, written by an English composer known by the name of Johannes Alanus or John Aleyn. It stands in the tradition of the Ars nova, the fourteenth-century school of polyphonic music based in France. It is notable for the historical information it provides about contemporary music life in England, and for its spectacularly sophisticated use of complex rhythmic devices, which mark it as a prime example of the stylistic outgrowth of the Ars nova known today as Ars subtilior. It has been dated conjecturally to either around 1358, which, within that school of composition, would make its compositional technique exceptionally innovative for its own time, or some time later during the 1370s.

== Text and contents ==
Sub Arturo plebs is a composition in three voices (tenor, motetus and triplum). Like all medieval motets, it has separate texts for each voice, which are sung simultaneously. All three texts are in Latin; the title under which the work is conventionally known in scholarship today consists of the opening words of each text. Their subject matter deals with music and musicians, following a tradition of similar "musician-motets" known from contemporary France. It includes a named reference to the composer of the work, making him one of the earliest named English composers, and a self-referential description of the work's own structure.

The tenor text (together with its melody) is taken from an existing Gregorian chant: "In omnem terram exivit sonus eorum, et in fines orbis terrae verba eorum". This in turn is citing a verse from the Bible: "Their voice has gone out through all the earth, their words to the end of the world." (Ps. 19.5 and Rom 10.18). The motetus and triplum texts are newly composed for this piece. Both are written in Latin rhyming stanzas.

The middle voice or motetus, which has six six-line stanzas, first contains the praise of a succession of biblical and historical figures, each of whom is credited with a founding role for music and composition: the biblical Jubal (here misspelled as "Tubal"), the ancient philosophers Pythagoras and Boethius, Pope Gregory I, and the medieval music theorists Guido of Arezzo and Franco of Cologne. The fifth stanza then spells out a rule for the performance of the piece itself, describing its structural plan (see below for an in-depth analysis):

Huius pes triplarii
bis sub emiolii
normis recitatur
ut hii pulsent Dominum,
quorum munum nominum
triplo modulator

The tenor ["pes", i.e. 'foot'] of this three-part piece
is recited twice
under the rule of the Hemiola [i.e. in a proportion of 2/3],
so that those whose name roll the triplum sings
may praise the Lord.

Finally, the last stanza of the motetus names the composer of the piece himself, "J. Alanus", who introduces himself as "the humblest and most insignificant" and prays for protection against envy:

Illis licet infimus
J. Alanus minimus
sese recommendat,
quatenus ab invidis
ipsum sonis validis
laus horum defendat.

To these recommends himself
the most humble and most insignificant J. Alanus,
so that their praise with its mighty sounds
may defend him from envy.

The third, upmost voice (triplum), in nine five-line stanzas, describes the flourishing of musical art at the contemporary English royal court, and contains the praise of a series of named English musicians of the composer's own time or recent past (thus contrasting with the motetus and its emphasis on ancient figures). It names fourteen individuals, described as accomplished singers and composers, all apparently associated with the English court. Their Latinized names are:

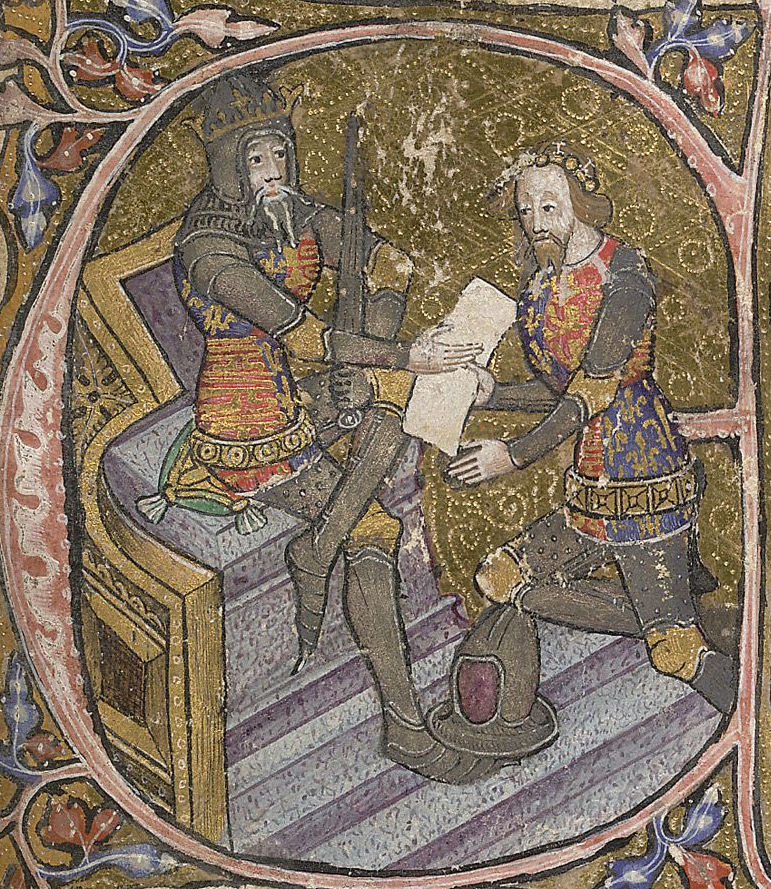
King Edward III and Edward, the Black Prince were the two royal personalities with whom the motet is directly connected.

- J. de Corbe
- J. de Alto Bosco
- G. Martinus
- Ricardus Blith
- Johannes de Oxonia
- G. Mughe
- Edmundus de Buria
- Blith G.
- Episwich J.
- Nicholaus de Vade Famelico
- G. de Horarum
- Symon
- Clemens
- Adam Levita

The first words of the text refer to a ruler under the legendary name of "Arturus" (i.e. Arthur), apparently an allusion to king Edward III (reigned 1327 – 1377), who liked to see his role as the founder of the Order of the Garter likened to that of the legendary Arthur. Another allusion to a "warlike prince" (princeps bellicus) among the musicians' royal patrons can easily be decoded as a reference to the king's famous son, Edward, the Black Prince. Historians who have researched the list of names, as well as that of Johannes Alanus himself, have been able to trace several of these individuals in historical sources, indicating that they were in fact all employed as musicians in either the Chapel Royal under Edward III, or in the private household chapel of the Black Prince, some time during the middle of the 14th century. The composer himself, identified as one John Aleyn, can be traced as the holder of various church offices ("King's clerk" at St. Paul's Cathedral, London, in 1361; a canon at Windsor, 1362; member of the Chapel Royal at least from 1364; died 1373).

== Dating ==
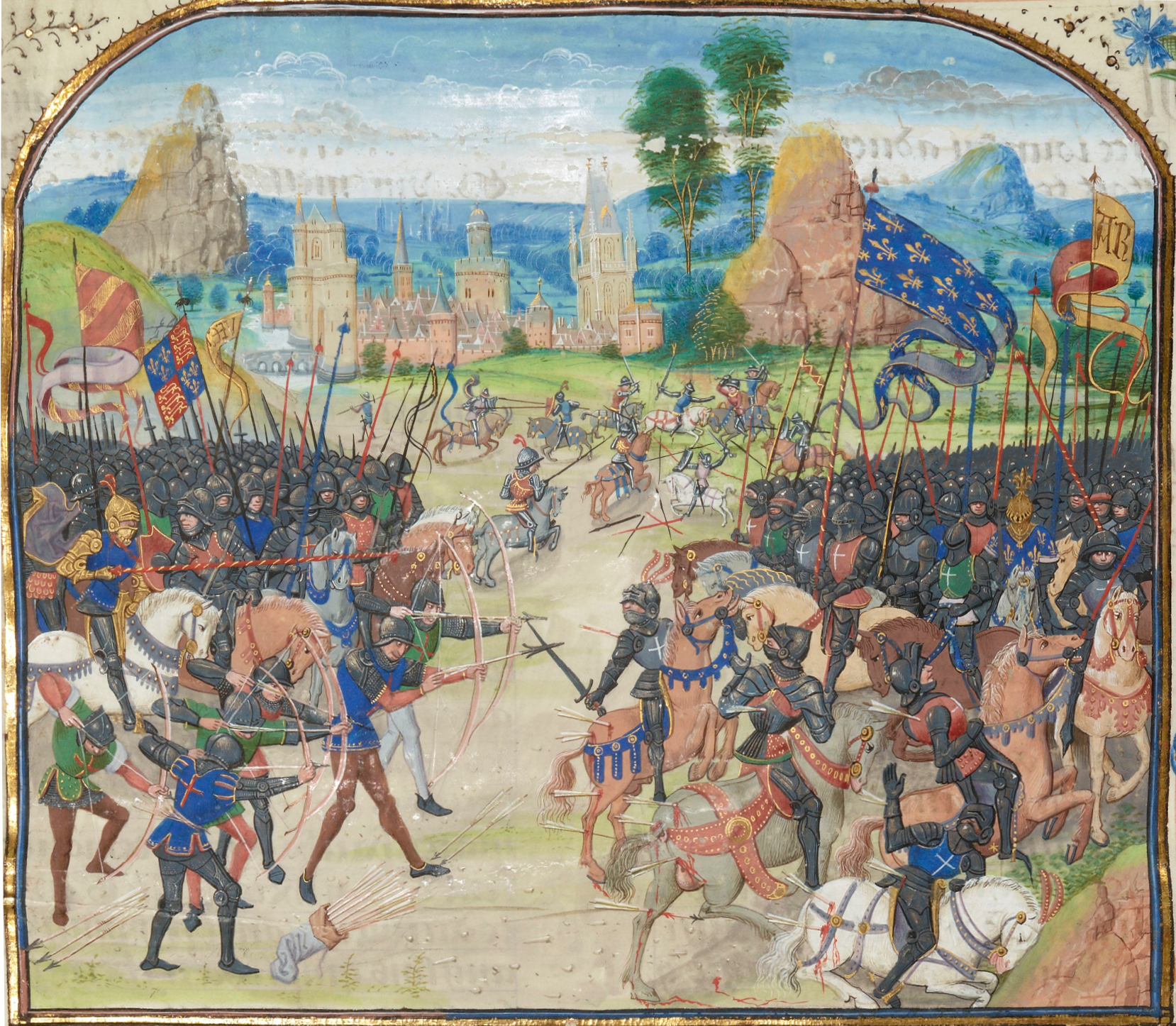
The Battle of Poitiers. According to one hypothesis, the motet was written for the occasion of the royal festivities in celebration of the English victory.

From various political allusions in the text, in connection with what is known about the named musicians, Brian Trowell and Ursula Günther have conjectured that the work was written for a specific historical event, the festivities at Windsor Castle on St. George's Day, 1358, when the knights of the Order of the Garter gathered to celebrate the English victory at the Battle of Poitiers two years earlier. Against this, Roger Bowers has proposed a dating somewhat later, in the early 1370s, i.e. the last years of life of John Aleyn. The earlier the dating, the more astonishing is the work on stylistic grounds, and the early dating has therefore been met with skepticism. The motet is characterised by a very significant structural innovation, the technique of multiple isorhtythmic diminution, which was to become a stock-in-trade technique of motet composition after 1400 but would be exceptionally innovative for 1358 or even still for 1370. Bowers comments on the idea that an English composer might have been the first to invent this technique:

There is nothing inherently improbable in this suggestion: not everything new in fourteenth-century composition had to come out of France […] And of course, as far as the originator was concerned, the occasion of its invention was not the conscious inauguration of a major formal development in the history of musical design; to him it was a smart but one-off party trick (of the originality of which he was justifiably proud)

== Textual tradition ==
The motet is known from three contemporary manuscript sources. One is Codex Chantilly, Musée Condé Ms. 564 (olim 1047), probably an Italian copy written after 1400, of a French original compiled around 1395. This codex contains 99 polyphonic chansons and 13 motets from the repertoire of the French Ars nova and Ars subtilior. It has been linked to the court of Gaston III of Foix-Béarn, count of Foix. The presence of an English piece in this otherwise French collection has been explained through contacts between this court and neighbouring English possessions in France. The second source is Codex Bologna, Civico Museo Bibliografico Musicale, Ms. Q 15, a collection that otherwise represents a somewhat later repertoire with many works from the early 15th century. A third manuscript was discovered in a private collection in the 1980s, in the form of a single sheet of music that was found bound into a 15th-century book.

== Structural analysis ==
=== Tenor structure ===
Sub arturo plebs is a pan-isorhythmic, three-part diminution motet. As with all isorhythmic motets, its structural plan is defined by its tenor part, the foundational voice of the composition. It consists of a sequence of 24 notes taken from a pre-existing piece of Gregorian plainchant, used as a cantus firmus. The source for this melody has been identified as a (slightly modified) piece from the first antiphon for the first nocturn of the commons for Apostles. The 24 notes are rhythmically defined as longae or breves in mensural notation, in such a way that, together with interspersed rests, they fill the time of 24 longae. This sequence is divided in three taleae, subsections measuring 8 longae each, each of which has the same repeated rhythmic sequence (hence the term isorhythm).

Structural schema of the isorhythmic tenor. Top: Underlying Gregorian chant melody. Second staff: Tenor as notated in Mensural notation, with the three mensuration signs defining the pattern of threefold diminution Staff 3–5: Tenor partially transcribed in modern notation. Each of the three repetitions of the tenor (colores) is faster by a factor of 2/3; each color contains three taleae repeating the same rhythmic pattern. Only the beginning notes of each talea are shown here.

The structural innovation of the diminution motet is that the whole tenor line is repeated three times in a modified, diminished form (thus resulting in a total nine-part structure). With each repetition, it is performed faster by a factor of two thirds. In the system of late medieval mensural notation, this is achieved by applying three different mensuration rules to the three repetitions.

- The first time the tenor is to be read in tempus perfectum cum prolatione maiore: each brevis note is measured as being subdivided in three semibreves with three minims each; thus each brevis corresponds to the length of a 9/8 bar in modern notation.
- The second time it is read in either tempus perfectum cum prolatione minore or tempus imperfectum cum prolatione maiore: each brevis note is measured either in three semibreves with two minims each or two semibreves with three minims each; thus corresponding to the length of either a 3/4 bar or a 6/8 bar in modern notation (the length of both being identical).
- The third time it is sung in tempus imperfectum cum prolatione minore: each brevis note is measured in two semibreves with two minims each; thus corresponding to the length of a 2/4 bar in modern notation.

This means that the length proportions of the tenor between the three repetitions is exactly 9:6:4. It is this rule that the motetum text describes with the words "bis sub emiolii normis recitatur". In the extant manuscripts, the scribes have provided additional indications for defining this canon. In the Chantilly manuscript, there is a repetition sign "]|[" after the tenor notes, with a rule spelled out in words as: "Canon primo de tempore perfecto maioris, secundo de tempore imperfecto maioris, tertio de tempore imperfecto minoris". A second scribe later added a second, slightly more wordy description of the same rule at the bottom of the page. In the Bologna manuscript, there is a repetition sign consisting of three vertical bars "|||", followed by the three standard mensuration signs written one over the other: a full circle with a dot in the middle, an empty circle, and an empty semicircle; in this case, the second repetition indicates tempus perfectum cum prolatione minore.

=== Pan-isorhythm in the upper voices ===
Isorhythm is present in the composition not only in the tenor, but also in the upper voices. However, these have isorhythmic repetitions only within each of the three main structural parts defined by the tenor repetitions, not across them. Inside each tenor repetition, each of the upper voices also repeats the same rhythmic pattern (but with a new melody) in each of the three taleae. As is common with isorhythmic motets, the upper voices are generally paced much faster than the tenor, often moving in eighth notes or fourth notes (minims and semibreves in medieval notation) where the tenor moves in long notes filling whole bars. The text of each upper voice is distributed in such a way that each of the three main parts, despite their diminishing length in time, has the same amount of text to convey (i.e. two stanzas in the motetus, three in the triplum). Thus, text declamation becomes progressively much faster towards the end of the composition, resulting in an overall effect of structural accelerando.

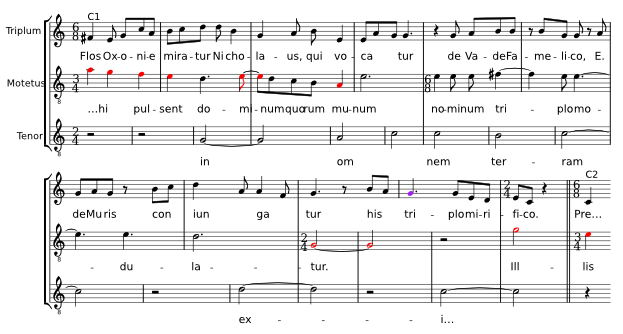
Polymetric structure between the three voices. This example shows the first rhythmic unit (talea) of the third, diminished, repetition of the tenor (color). The tenor moves in 2/4 time, the triplum simultaneously in 6/8 time. The motetus shifts between 3/4, 6/8 and 2/4 time, indicated by notes written in red in the original source. The same pattern in all three voices repeats twice more in the remaining two taleae. Since the length of the tenor talea (16 × 2/4) cannot be divided into 6/8 bars, the triplum has to put in one isolated 2/4 bar at the end of each talea. There is an alternative reading proposed by some editors: according to them, the note G in the third-but-last bar in the triplum, marked in purple here, is to be read as a simple undotted quaver (an imperfect semibreve). Then, the triplum will maintain its 6/8 movement throughout, but its second and third talea will not be perfectly aligned with those of the other voices, being shifted back by one eighth note with each repetition of the pattern.

The metric and rhythmic relations between the three voices are quite complex. The triplum moves in tempus imperfectum cum prolatione maiore (6/8 time) throughout, no matter what the current meter of the tenor is; this results in complex patterns of overlap and syncopation. The motetus is even more complex, as it shifts between meters multiple times. This is indicated in the notation by frequent use of colaration, the use of note heads filled in in red to indicate that their temporal value is shortened to two thirds their nominal value.
