= Contenance angloise =

Musical polyphonic style

The Contenance angloise, or English manner, a distinctive style of musical polyphony, developed in fifteenth-century England. It uses full, rich harmonies based on the third and sixth. It became highly influential in the fashionable Burgundian court of Philip the Good (r. 1419–1467), and on European music of the era. Its leading proponent was John Dunstaple (c. 1390 – 1453), followed by Walter Frye and John Hothby (c. 1410 – 1487).

== Origins of the term ==
The phrase Contenance Angloise was coined by Martin le Franc in 1441–42, in a poem dedicated to Duke Philip the Good of Burgundy (1396–1467) to describe the era's distinctive musical style. Le Franc mentioned English composer John Dunstaple (c. 1390–1453) as the key figure and a major influence on the Burgundian composers Guillaume Dufay and Gilles Binchois.

== Characteristics ==
It is not clear exactly what Martin le Franc saw as the elements of the Contenance Angloise. Musicologists have noted the style as a distinctive form of melodic polyphony using full, rich harmonies based on the third and sixth, which may have made lyrics easier to articulate.

== Major composers ==
Although nearly all of Dunstaple's manuscript music in England was lost during the Dissolution of the Monasteries (1536–1540), some of his works have been reconstructed from copies found in continental Europe (particularly Italy), the existence of which indicates his widespread fame in Europe. He may have been the first composer to provide liturgical music with an instrumental accompaniment.

This tradition was continued by figures such as:

- Walter Frye (c. 1420–1475), whose masses were recorded and highly influential in France and the Netherlands
- John Hothby (c. 1410–1487), an English Carmelite friar who travelled widely, composed occasionally, and wrote several theoretical treatises including La Calliopea legale; he is also credited with introducing innovations to the medieval pitch system

== Decline ==
The influence of English composers on the continent seems to have declined towards the end of the fifteenth century when, having lost their major possessions in France, and entering the Wars of the Roses, they may have been preoccupied with domestic matters. Franco-Flemish music then became the dominant force in European music and the Tudor votive style began to develop in England.
