= Leonel Power =

Late medieval English composer

Leonel Power (also spelled Lionel, Lyonel, Leonellus, Leonelle; Polbero), c. 1380–1445, was an English composer of the early Renaissance. Along with John Dunstaple he was a dominant figure of 15th-century English music. Mainly a composer of motets and of sections of the Mass, he is the best-represented contributor in the Old Hall Manuscript. Occasionally he is referred to by his Christian name only.

== Life and career ==
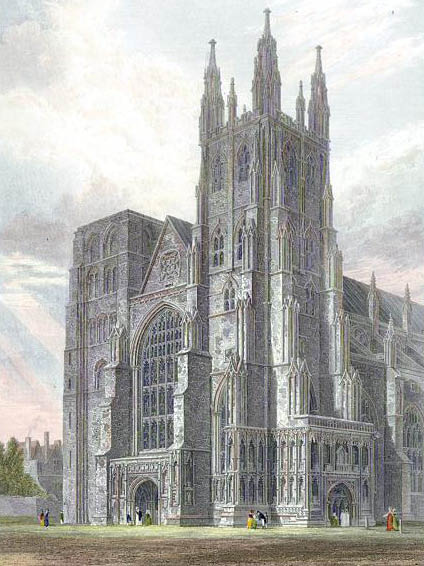
An 1821 engraving of western towers of the Canterbury Cathedral. Power was a member of the cathedral's fraternity and worked here as a choir master.

Very little is known about Power's life. Documents dating from the early 1440s refer to him as a native of Kent. Stylistic analysis of his music, as well as his probable age during his known appointments, show that he may have been born between 1370 and 1385. A suggestion that Power was of Irish origin, which appeared in W.H.G. Flood's 1905 A History of Irish Music, is usually discounted by modern scholars, since Flood is not known to have had any other sources on Power's life than are currently available.

The earliest dated reference to Power refers to him as instructor to the choristers of the household chapel of Thomas of Lancaster, 1st Duke of Clarence. The duke died in 1421; the next reference to Power is from 1423: on 14 May he joined the fraternity of Christ Church, Canterbury. He almost certainly served as choirmaster of the cathedral, and may also have been employed by John of Lancaster, 1st Duke of Bedford. He died at Canterbury on 5 June 1445 and was buried the next day; several notices of his death survive.

== Music and influence ==
While Power's output was slightly less than Dunstaple's (only 40 extant pieces can be definitely attributed to him), his influence was similar. He is the composer best represented in the Old Hall Manuscript, one of the only undamaged sources of English music from the early 15th century (most manuscripts were destroyed during the Dissolution of the Monasteries in 1536–1540 under Henry VIII).

Power was one of the first composers to set separate movements of the Ordinary of the Mass which were thematically unified and intended for contiguous performance. The Old Hall Manuscript contains his mass based on the Marian antiphon, Alma Redemptoris Mater, in which the antiphon is stated literally in the tenor in each movement, unornamented. This is the only cyclic setting of the mass Ordinary which can be attributed to him.

== Works ==
Masses

- Kyrie, Gloria, Credo, Sanctus, Agnus, for 3vv (on Rex seculorum; possibly by Dunstaple)
- Kyrie, Gloria, Credo, Sanctus, Agnus, for 3vv (Sine nomine; possibly by Dunstaple or Benet)
- Gloria, Credo, Sanctus, Agnus, for 3vv (on Alma redemptoris mater)
- Gloria, Credo, for 4–5vv
- Gloria, Credo, for 3vv (on lauds antiphons for St. Thomas of Canterbury)
- Sanctus, Agnus, for 3vv (on Sarum Sanctus II, Agnus VII)
- Sanctus, Agnus, for 4vv (on Sarum Sanctus III, Agnus XII)
- 2 Kyrie settings, 6 Gloria settings, 3 Credo settings, 5 Sanctus settings, and 3 Agnus settings; some fragmentary and/or of questionable attribution

Other works

- Alma redemptoris mater, 2 versions for 3vv (possibly by Dunstaple)
- Anima mea liquefacta est (Christus resurgens), for 2/3vv
- Anima mea liquefacta est, for 3vv
- Ave regina celorum, ave, for 3vv
- Ave regina celorum, ave, for 4vv
- Beata progenies, for 3vv
- Beata viscera, for 3vv
- Gloriose virginis, for 4vv
- Ibo michi ad montem, for 3vv
- Mater ora filium, for 3vv
- Quam pulchra es, for 3vv
- Regina celi, for 3vv
- Salve mater Salvatoris, for 3vv (possibly by Dunstaple)
- Salve regina, for 3vv (paraphrase of plainchant Alma redemptoris)
- Salve regina, for 3vv
- Salve sancta parens (Virgo prudentissima), for 3vv
