= John Hothby =

English theorist and composer (1410–1487)

John Hothby (Otteby, Hocby, Octobi, Ottobi, c. 1410–1487), also known by his Latinised names Johannes Ottobi or Johannes de Londonis, was an English Renaissance music theorist and composer who travelled widely in Europe and gained an international reputation for his work.

== Biography ==
Little is known of the origins or early life of John Hothby. He appears to have left England after 1435 but most of the references to him in surviving sources are to the last twenty years of his life, by which time he had taken vows as a Carmelite friar and he claimed in his own work to have travelled in Britain, Germany, France, Spain and Italy, before he went to a convent in Ferrara and then in 1467 took employment in Lucca, probably teaching music at the cathedral. In 1486 he was recalled to England by the new king Henry VII and appears to have died in the north of England in the following year.

== Work and influence ==
Surviving compositions include six sacred Latin works and three secular Italian songs. Exactly which works on music theory Hothby wrote is unclear and some older works may have been attributed to him and some contemporary works often given under this name may have been written by another author Johannes de Anglia. Work generally attributed to him includes La Calliopea Legale and Proportiones Secundum. Surviving work suggests that he was a traditionalist, defending the Pythagorean tuning and Guidonian pitch in the face of reforms proposed by Bartolomé Ramos de Pareja, but is chiefly notable for modifications to the pitch system to accommodate sharp and flat notes. His work was widely known in Britain and continental Europe and he may have been the most important figure in communicating musical ideas of the Contenance Angloise between England and the continent.

== Editions ==
- Seay, Albert, ed. (1964). The Musical Works of John Hothby. Corpus mensurabilis musicae. Vol. 33. Cambridge: American Institute of Musicology. ISBN 978-1-59551-113-3. OCLC 558697.
