= Gimell Records =

Record label

- Founded: 1981
- Founder: Peter Phillips; Steve Smith
- Genre: Classical music
- Country of origin: United Kingdom
- Location: United Kingdom
- Official website: gimell.com

Gimell Records was established in 1980 by Peter Phillips and Steve Smith, specifically to record the work of the British vocal ensemble the Tallis Scholars. As of June 2024 its catalogue numbers 60 original albums and 15 compilation albums. The label "performed a pioneering role in the re-appraising of unaccompanied sacred choral music of the 15th and 16th centuries." According to Hyperion Records, Gimell was the first "single-artist label", preceding other similar labels by several years. It was also the first independent record label to receive the Gramophone Record of the Year award, achieving this feat in 1987 with a recording of Josquin des Prez.

== Name ==
The label was named after the technique “gymel”, a corruption of the Latin word “gimellus”, meaning a twin, which was found in Tudor manuscripts where a part is twinned with another part. Phillips explained, "You have to understand that in those days the music wasn't written in score; it was written in parts, so you'd only see your part. If you were singing your part and you saw the word ‘gimell’ it had to be decided in rehearsal that some of you singing that part would have to look elsewhere on the page, or even pick up another book and find your part."

== History ==
Steve Smith, a music and sound recording student on the Tonmeister course at the University of Surrey, met Peter Phillips, a student at St John's College, Oxford, when Smith recorded The Tallis Scholars as part of a student project at the Chapel of Merton College, Oxford in 1976. After graduation, and unable to find a suitable recording contract for a Tallis Scholars' album – Phillips had unsuccessfully approached Deutsche Grammophon, Philips and EMI – Phillips and Smith set up their own company, Gimell Records. Of this Phillips said, "Not only were the big labels not interested in us – which I can understand because we were very new at the time – but also it was clear that they had no interest in the repertory that we wanted to do." The choir's first LP was recorded at Merton College in March 1980. They would continue to record there until 1987, returning in 2005.

In mid-1996, Philips Classics, part of Polygram Classics, acquired a majority share of Gimell Records. This was just before Philips Classics was "subsequently swallowed up by industry giant, Universal". Tallis Scholars' recordings were temporarily removed from the catalogue, but Phillips and Smith regained control and re-established Gimell in 2000. Its first new issue after this hiatus was in 2000, Missa si bona suscepimus by Cristóbal de Morales.

== Recording technology ==
Gimell's founding coincided with the rise of the compact disc and Phillips and Smith "recognised early on how the clarity of the digital sound could benefit Renaissance choral music." In 1984 Gimell was the first label to place a commercial order with a British CD manufacturer.

Gimell re-launched its website in 2007. It was only the second website globally to sell high resolution downloads. The following year the site was the first to sell FLAC surround sound downloads. In 2017 Gimell announced it would stop selling CDs and downloads from its website, which resulted in an immediate spike in sales, exceeding sales for the entire previous year.

In 2013 the group's 2007 recording of Allegri's Miserere was one of the first albums to be released on Pure Audio Blu-Ray. In 2022 Smith re-mastered the same recording with Spatial audio for Dolby Atmos.

== Fifty Shades of Grey ==
In 2012 E. L. James published her best-selling novel Fifty Shades of Grey which referenced Thomas Tallis's 40-part motet Spem in alium. As a direct result, sales of Gimell's 1985 album Spem in Alium "outsold even the tenor Luciano Pavarotti", putting it at number one in the British UK Classical Charts. The subsequent release of Fifty Shades of Grey: The Classical Album by EMI later in the year saw Gimell at the top of the charts once more. James was quoted as saying "I am delighted to have introduced so many of my readers to this amazing 16th century piece of music... the recording from the Tallis Scholars is particularly special.”

== Awards ==
Year	Nominee / work	Award	Result
1987	Recording of the Year for Josquin's Missa Pange lingua and Missa La sol fa re mi	Gramophone Awards	Won
1989	Diapason d'Or de l'Année for Lassus's Missa Osculetur me	Diapason d'Or	Won
1989	Diapason d'Or de l'Année for Josquin's L'homme armé masses	Diapason d'Or	Won
1991	Early Music Award for Palestrina's Missa Assumpta est Maria and Missa Sicut lilium	Gramophone Awards	Won
1994	Early Music Award for Rore's Missa Praeter rerum seriem	Gramophone Awards	Won
1994	Classic FM People's Choice Award for Rore's Missa Praeter rerum seriem	Gramophone Awards	Won
2001	Best Small Ensemble Performance for Morales's Missa Si bona suscepimus	Grammy Awards	Nominated
2005	Early Music Award for music from the Eton Choirbook by John Browne	Gramophone Awards	Won
2009	Best Small Ensemble Performance for Josquin's Missa Malheur me bat and Missa Fortuna desperata	Grammy Awards	Nominated
2010	Best Small Ensemble Performance for Victoria's Lamentations of Jeremiah	Grammy Awards	Nominated
2012	Diapason d'Or de l'Année for Josquin's Missa De beata virgine and Missa Ave maris stella	Diapason d'Or	Won
2021	Record of the Year for Josquin's Missa Hercules Dux Ferrarie, Missa D'ung aultre amer, and Missa Faysant regretz	BBC Music Magazine	Won
2021	Early Music Award for Josquin's Missa Hercules Dux Ferrarie, Missa D'ung aultre amer, and Missa Faysant regretz	Gramophone Classical Music Awards	Won

== Discography ==
=== 1980s ===
Year	Composer/s	Title / Works	Detail
1980	Allegri / Palestrina / Mundy	Miserere / Missa Papae Marcelli / Vox parts caeliestis	#1 HMV Classical Chart, February 1981
1981	Palestrina	Missa Benedicta es/ Motet	
1982	Tavener, Rachmaninov, Stravinsky, Bortniansky and anon	Russian Orthodox Music	
1982	Gibbons, Byrd, Weelkes, Morley, Tomkins, etc.	English Madrigals	
1983	Palestrina, Lhéritier, Victoria and de Silva	Missa Nigra sum / Motets	
1984	John Taverner	Missa Gloria tibi Trinitas/ Leroy Kyrie/ Dum transisset I	
1984	Tavener	Ikon of Light/ Funeral Ikos/ The Lamb	
1985	Tallis	Spem in alium and other Latin-texted works	
1985	Byrd	The Three Masses	
1986		Christmas Carols and Motets	
1986	Palestrina	Missa Brevis/ Missa Nasce la gioja mia	
1986	Tallis	The Complete English Anthems	
1986	Josquin de Pres	Missa Pange Lingua/ Missa La sol fa re mi	Gramophone Magazine Record of the Year, 1987
1987	Gesualdo	Tenebrae responsories for Holy Saturday/ Four Marian Motets	
1987	Clemens	Missa Pastores quidnam vidistis/ Motets	
1987	Victoria / Lobo	Requiem/ Versa Est in Luctum	
1987	Byrd	The Great Service/ Anthems	
1988		Sarum Chant: Missa in Gallicantu	
1988	Cornysh	Stabat Mater, Magnificat, Salve regina and other motets and secular songs	
1989	John Sheppard	Media Vita	
1989	Josquin de Pres	L'homme armé Masses	Diapason d'Or de l'Année
1989	Lassus	Missa Osculetur me/ Motets	
1989	Palestrina	Missa Assumpta est Maria/ Missa Sicut lilum	Gramophone magazine Early Music Award, 1991

=== 1990s ===
Year	Composer/s	Title / Works	Detail
1990		Music featured on the South Bank Show	1-disc reissue to accompany the programme
1990	Cardoso	Requiem/ Magnificat/ Motets	
1990	Victoria	Tenebrae Responsories	
1991	Isaac	Missa de Apostolis/ Motets	
1991	Thomas Tomkins	The Great Service/ Anthems	
1992	Antoine Brumel	Missa Et ecce terrae motus (The Earthquake Mass)/ Lamentations/ Magnificat	
1992	Duarte Lobo	Requiem/ Missa Vox clamantis	
1992	Tallis	Lamentations of Jeremiah / Motets and Antiphons	
1993	Byrd	William Byrd	2-disc reissue to commemorate the 450th anniversary of the composer's birth
1993	Taverner, Tye and Sheppard	The Western Wind Masses	
1994	Palestrina	The Palestrina 400 Collection	4-disc reissue to commemorate the 400th anniversary of the composer's death
1994	Cipriano de Rore	Missa Praeter rerum seriem/ Motets	Gramophone Early Music Award, 1994; Gramophone/Classic FM People's Choice Award, 1994; Zlatá Harmonie Award, Brno, 1995
1994	Allegri, Palestrina	Live in Rome: Allegri and Palestrina	Winner, Cannes Classical Awards at MIDEM, 1995
1995	Taverner	John Taverner	1-disc reissue to commemorate the 450th anniversary of the composer's death
1995	White	Lamentations/ Magnificat/ Motets	
1996	Jacob Obrecht	Missa Maria Zart	
1997		A Tudor Collection	2-disc reissue
1997	Johannes Ockeghem	Missa Au travail suis/ Missa De plus en plus and their chansons	
1997	Alonso Lobo	Missa Maria Magdalene/ Motets	
1997		The Yearning Spirit: Voices of Contemplation	1-disc reissue
1998	Ferrabosco, Tallis, White, Brumel, Palestrina	Lamenta: Lamentations	
1998		Tallis Scholars 25th Anniversary	2-disc reissue
1998	Josquin, Obrecht, Taverner, Byrd, Tallis, Mundy	Tallis Scholars Live in Oxford	
1998	Tallis	Missa Puer natus (The Christmas Mass)/ Magnificat/ Motets	
1999		The Best of the Renaissance	2-disc reissue

=== 2000s ===
Year	Composer/s	Title / Works	Detail
2000	Morales	Missa Si bona suscipimus/ Motet	Nominated for a Grammy, 2002
2001	Allegri	Miserere	Reissue of the 1980 release
2001	John Tavener	Ikon of Light/ Funeral Ikos/ The Lamb	Reissue of the 1984 release
2001	Nicolas Gombert	Magnificats 1-4/ chant antiphons	
2002	Nicholas Gombert	Magnificats 5-8/ chant antiphons	
2002	Tallis	The Complete English Anthems	Reissue of the 1986 release
2002	Tallis	Lamentations of Jeremiah	Reissue of the 1992 release
2003		Christmas with the Tallis Scholars	2-disc reissue
2003		The Essential Tallis Scholars	2-disc reissue
2004	Palestrina	The Tallis Scholars sing Palestrina	2-disc reissue
2004	Tallis	The Tallis Scholars sing Thomas Tallis	2-disc reissue
2005	Allegri	Miserere	25th Anniversary Edition of the 1980 release
2005	John Browne	Music from the Eton Choirbook	Gramophone Early Music Award, 2005
2005	Palestrina	Tallis Scholars sing Palestrina	2-disc reissue
2005	Victoria/ D. Lobo/ Cardoso	Requiem	2-disc reissue
2006	Guerrero	Missa Surge Propera/ Motets	
2006	Palestrina	Missa Benedicta es	25th Anniversary Edition of the 1981 release
2006	Byrd	Playing Elizabeth's Tune: Byrd's Mass for Four Voices/ Motets	
2006		Renaissance Giants	2-disc reissue
2006	Josquin de Pres	The Tallis Scholars sing Josquin	2-disc reissue
2007	Allegri / Palestrina	Miserere / Missa Papae Marcelli and Motets	New recordings
2007		English Madrigals	25th Anniversary Edition of the 1982 release
2007	Byrd	The Tallis Scholars sing William Byrd	2-disc reissue
2008	Josquin de Pres	Missa Sine nomine/ Missa Ad fugam	
2008		The Tallis Scholars sing Tudor Church Music - Volume One	2-disc reissue
2008		The Tallis Scholars sing Tudor Church Music - Volume Two	2-disc reissue
2009		Flemish Masters	2-disc reissue
2009	Josquin de Pres	Missa Malheur me bat/ Missa Fortuna desperata	Diapason d'Or, 2010; Nominated for a Grammy, 2009

=== 2010s ===
Year	Composer/s	Title / Works	Detail
2010		Sacred Music in the Renaissance, Vol. 1	4-disc reissue to celebrate Gimell's 30th anniversary
2010		Sacred Music in the Renaissance, Vol. 2	4-disc reissue to celebrate Gimell's 30th anniversary
2010		Sacred Music in the Renaissance, Vol. 3	4-disc reissue to celebrate Gimell's 30th anniversary
2010	Victoria	Lamentations of Jeremiah	Nominated for a Grammy, 2010
2011	Josquin de Pres	Missa De beata virgine and Missa Ave maris stella	Diapason d'Or de l'Année, 2012
2011		The Victoria Collection	3-disc reissue to commemorate the 400th anniversary of the composer's death
2012	Mouton	Missa Dictes moy toutes voz pensées/ Motets	
2013	Allegri / Palestrina	Miserere / Missa Papae Marcelli	Pure Audio Blu-ray release of the 2007 disc
2013	Whitacre	Sainte-Chapelle	Single track download, not available on CD
2013	Taverner	Missa Gloria tibi Trinitas/ Magnificats	Winner, 51st Japan Record Academy Early Music Award, 2013 #1 for several weeks, UK Specialist Classical Chart, 2013
2013		Renaissance Radio	2-disc reissue of selected tracks
2014	Tavener	Ikon of Light/ Funeral Ikos/ The Lamb	Reissue of the 1984 release to commemorate the death of the composer
2015	Arvo Pärt	Tintinnabuli	MusicWeb International Recording of the Year
2015		Perfect Polyphony	2-disc reissue of selected tracks
2015	John Taverner	Missa Corona spinea/ Dum transisset Sabbatum I and II	
2016	Josquin de Pres	Missa Di dadi/ Missa Une mousse de Biscaye	
2016	Josquin de Pres	Missa Gaudeamus/ Missa L'ami Baudichon	
2019	Josquin / Bauldeweyn / Brumel	Missa Mater Patris/ Missa Da pacem/ Mater Patris	

=== 2020s ===
Year	Composer/s	Title / Works	Detail
2020	Allegri	Miserere	1980 version remastered for Gimell's 40th anniversary
2021	Josquin de Pres	Missa Hercules Dux Ferrarie - Missa D'ung aultre amer - Missa Faysant regretz	
2023	John Sheppard	Missa Cantate	
2024	Robert Fayrfax	Robert Fayrfax	

== Other releases ==
- Live in Rome: Celebrating Palestrina's 400th Anniversary – DVD (1994)
- Playing Elizabeth's Tune: The Tallis Scholars Sings William Byrd – DVD and SACD in conjunction with BBC (2004)
- Francisco Guerrero: Missa Surge propera – SACD (2006)
- Allegri's Miserere and Palestrina's Missa Papae Marcelli – Blu-ray (2014)

== Other artists ==
In 1999, during the brief period when it was a part of Philips Classics, Gimell produced Acantus' Sacred Songs of Medieval Italy and Anúna's Deep Dead Blue.
