= Musica Secreta =

UK musical group

- Origin: London, England
- Genres: Early music, Renaissance music, Baroque music
- Years active: 1991–present
- Labels: Amon Ra, Linn, Divine Art, Obsidian
- Members: Laurie Stras; Katharine Hawnt; Sally Dunkley; Yvonne Eddy; Hannah Ely; Kat Carson; Nancy Cole; Bethany Horak-Hallett; Caroline Trevor; Kim Porter; Claire Williams; Alison Kinder
- Past members: Catherine King; Tessa Bonner; Mary Nichols; David Miller; John Toll
- Website: www.musicasecreta.com

Musica Secreta is a British vocal ensemble that was founded in 1991 by soprano Deborah Roberts to explore music written by and for women in the 16th and 17th centuries. In 2000, musicologist Laurie Stras joined the ensemble as a co-director. The group has made several award-winning albums. They collaborated with novelist Sarah Dunant in a musical dramatization of Dunant's novel Sacred Hearts which ran between 2009 and 2012.

Their album Lucrezia Borgia's Daughter (2017) is a recording of the earliest known published music intended for performance by nuns. The recording features motets printed in the anonymous Musica quinque vocum motteta materna lingua vocata printed in 1543; some may have been written by Eleonora d'Este, the only surviving daughter of Lucrezia Borgia and Alfonso I d'Este, Duke of Ferrara.

== Members ==
The original members of the group were Roberts, Tessa Bonner, Mary Nichols, and harpsichordist John Toll.

Group members have sung with the Tallis Scholars, the Consort of Musicke, The Sixteen, I Fagiolini, Tenebrae, and Magnificat. Collaborators have included Suzie LeBlanc (The Secret Music of Luzzasco Luzzaschi), Emily Van Evera (Dangerous Graces), Catherine King (Songs of Ecstasy and Devotion, Dialogues with Heaven, Dangerous Graces), and Clare Wilkinson (Sacred Hearts, Secret Music). Featured instrumentalists include Paula Chateauneuf, David Miller and Lynda Sayce (lute, theorbo, and chitarrone); Frances Kelly (harp); Mark Levy and Kinga Gáborjáni (viol); Matthew Halls and Nicholas Parle (organ and harpsichord). The instrumental team is Claire Williams and Alison Kinder.

== Celestial Sirens ==
Roberts and Stras also co-directed an amateur female-voice choir, Celestial Sirens. Musica Secreta and Celestial Sirens first performed together at the Brighton Early Music Festival in 2006. Stras's work with Celestial Sirens was recognised by the National Coordinating Centre for Public Engagement in 2014, for Best Individually-Led Project in the Engage Awards 2014.

== Awards and honors ==
- Diapason Découverte from Diapason magazine for Dangerous Graces, 2002
- Best Arts and Media Project from the Society for the Study of Early Modern Women for Alessandro Grandi: Motetti a cinque voci (1614), 2007
- Editor's Choice, Gramophone magazine, Sacred Hearts, Secret Music, November 2009
- Noah Greenberg Award from the American Musicological Society for Lucrezia Borgia's Daughter, 2016

== Discography ==
- The Secret Music of Luzzasco Luzzaschi: Luzzasco Luzzaschi: Madrigali...a uno, doi e tre soprani (1601) (Amon Ra, 1992)
- La virtuosissima cantatrice: the Vocal Music of Barbara Strozzi (1619–c.1665) (Amon Ra, 1994)
- Songs of Ecstasy and Devotion – Lucrezia Vizzana: Componimenti musicali (1623) (Linn, 1997)
- Dialogues with Heaven: Motets by Chiara Margherita Cozzolani (Linn, 2000)
- Dangerous Graces: Music by Cipriano de Rore and His Pupils (Linn, 2002)
- Alessandro Grandi: Motetti a cinque voci (1614) (Divine Art, 2007)
- Sacred Hearts, Secret Music (Divine Art, 2009)
- Lucrezia Borgia's Daughter (Obsidian, 2017)
