= Tessa Bonner =

British soprano (1951–2008)

- Bonner from a 1985 newspaper
- Born: Teresa Margaret Pollard; 28 February 1951; Hammersmith, London
- Died: 31 December 2008 (aged 57); Sydenham, London
- Education: University of Leeds; Guildhall School of Music and Drama
- Occupations: Classical soprano in: Early music; Renaissance music; Baroque music; opera
- Years active: 1979-2008
- Partners: Dyl Bonner (m. 1972, div. 1980); Graeme Curry (m. 1986, div. 1999); Donald Greig
- Children: 1

Tessa Bonner (28 February 1951 - 31 December 2008) was a soprano, specialising in repertoire of the Renaissance, Baroque and Classical eras. She sang with The Tallis Scholars for 25 years, with whom she recorded 37 albums and performed in 1,100 concerts. Bonner co-founded Musica Secreta, an ensemble specialising in performing the music of 17th century female composers.

== Early life and education ==
Bonner was born in Hammersmith, London to Ron Pollard and Margaret née Good. She grew up in Fulham and Hounslow and attended Isleworth Green School for Girls. She was a junior exhibitioner at the London College of Music where she showed promise as a pianist and clarinettist. After leaving school, Bonner worked as a production assistant at the BBC on programmes including Blue Peter and Face the Music. At 25 she attended the University of Leeds, where she studied voice under Honor Sheppard, continuing her studies as a prize-winning student of Margaret Lensky and Ellis Keeler at the Guildhall School of Music and Drama in 1979.

== Singing career ==
Peter Phillips, director of the Tallis Scholars, described her as "one of the seminal sopranos of the early music movement." Prof. Richard Rastall suggested that Bonner, together with another Tallis Scholars soprano Caroline Trevor "may well approximate to the sound of a good sixteenth-century boy in his late teens."

=== Ensembles ===
In 1979 Bonner was offered her first professional singing engagement by Andrew Parrott with the Taverner Choir. She would go on to sing with The Tallis Scholars, the New London Consort, The Sixteen, the Lute Group, the Gabrieli Consort, Collegium Musicum 90, The King's Consort, Academy of Ancient Music, St James' Baroque, Consort of Musicke, His Majestys Sagbutts & Cornetts, Collegium Vocale Gent and London Mozart Players.

=== Soloist ===
As a soloist she recorded many albums, including:

Year	Composer/s	Title / Work	Ensemble
1983	Monteverdi	Vespro Della Beata Vergine 1610	Taverner Consort and Players
1986	Grabbe	Il Primo Libro de Madrigali	The Consort of Musicke
1987	Anonymous	Carmina Burana	New London Consort
1988	Purcell	Royal and Ceremonial Odes	The King's Consort
1988	Caccini etc.	Una "Stravaganza" dei Medici	Taverner Consort and Players
1988		Music from the time of Christian IV: Church Music at Court and In Town	The Hilliard Ensemble
1990	Monteverdi	Vespro Della Beata Vergine 1610	New London Consort
1990	Mozart	Die Zauberflöte	Roger Norrington
1991	Vivaldi, J S Bach	Gloria; Ostro Picta; Magnificat	Collegium Musicum 90
1991	J S Bach	Johannes-Passion	Taverner Consort and Players
1992	Gibbons	Songs and Anthems	Rose Consort of Viols with Red Byrd
1992	Purcell	Complete Odes and Welcome Song's	The King's Consort
1993	Monteverdi	L'Orfeo	New London Consort
1994	Byrd	Songs and Anthems	Rose Consort of Viol with Red Byrd
1994	Biber	Requiem	New London Consort
1994	Praetorius	Christmas Mass	Gabrieli Consort and Players
1995	Purcell	The Indian Queen	The Purcell Simfony
1995	Tye, Byrd etc.	La Renaissance Anglaise	Red Byrd
1995	Monteverdi	Ballo delle ingrate	New London Consort
2006	Monteverdi	Monteverdi Vespers	Gabrieli Consort

== Musica Secreta ==
Together with Deborah Roberts, Mary Nichols and John Toll, Bonner co-founded Musica Secreta in 1991. They recorded the music of neglected female composers, including Francesca Caccini and Barbara Strozzi.

== Alternative music ==
Bonner appeared in the choir on Cradle of Filth's 2004 album Nymphetamine.

== Death ==
Bonner was diagnosed with oral cancer in January 2008. She returned to work in May of the same year and sang her final concert with the Tallis Scholars on 27 November 2008, dying on New Year's Eve. Her long-term partner Donald Greig dedicated his 2012 book Time Will Tell to Bonner. Penelope Shuttle dedicated a poem Under a sixty-year old crab tree to Bonner in her 2016 poetry collection Heath.
