= Nicole Alexander (producer) =

Australian born film producer

- Born: August 14, 1978 (age 48); Sydney, Australia
- Occupations: Music and television producer, director, editor

Nicole Alexander (born 14 August 1978) is an Australian music and television and producer, director, and editor based in Los Angeles. She formerly worked as the director of production and music producer for the Viacom Entertainment Group (MTVN Entertainment Group) before becoming the vice president of production, development and talent for 1iota 1iota Studios. Alexander is CEO and director of Hashtag, You're It.

== Early life and education ==
Nicole Alexander was born in Sydney. She attended the Sydney Conservatorium of Music and was the recipient of various vocal scholarships including the Helen Myers Vocal Scholarship and the Sydney Savage Club Vocal Scholarship.

She graduated with a Bachelor of Music.

She is a graduate of New York University in filmmaking and in September 2009 was awarded the Joan Sutherland Scholarship from the American Australian Association.

== Career ==
Alexander established Alexander Productions in 2004, and Hashtag, You're It in the US in 2017.

In 2005, she produced "A Mid-Summer Opera 2005" and "A Mid-Winter Recital 2005" at the Sydney Conservatorium of Music. In 2006, she produced Les Misérables – The Schools Edition (dir. Kate Gaul) at NIDA, The Royal Flying Doctor's Concert at City Recital Hall Angel Place and "A Mid-Summer Opera" featuring the world premiere of Love's Lessons Learned (Sussman/Dickinson) at the Sydney Conservatorium. In 2007, she produced the Australian production of Dead Man Walking at the State Theatre Sydney (directed by Nigel Jamieson, starring Teddy Tahu Rhodes). She also produced the Australian Tour of the Tallis Scholars (directed by Peter Phillips, sponsored by ABC Classic FM), the NSW premiere of Carmen The Musical at the Sydney Theatre (directed by Nigel Jamieson), Girls of the Night, Vox and Vintage (hosted by Stuart Maunder), and the first Australian International Residential Tallis Scholars Summer School led by director Peter Phillips at St John's College, The University of Sydney. In 2009 Alexander produced a series of various recital concerts including a large combined gala concert for the Loreto Voices and Australian Brandenburg Orchestra at City Recital Hall Angel Place.

Alexander was the vocal coach for Belvoir St Theatre's (Company B) production of The Man from Mukinupin (dir. Wesley Enoch). She also appeared as a vocal coach on Australian Idol in 2009. In 2004, she assisted with the children's casting of Disney's The Lion King (dir. Julie Taymor) in Australia. Alexander coached the two cantor soloists for the World Youth Day 2008 Opening Mass, the soloist for the Evening Vigil with the Pope and the soprano soloist for the Joan of Arc, Voices of Light, Oratorio in the Sydney Domain.

Alexander's performing credits include Dido in Dido and Aeneas, Sarah in Guys and Dolls, Josie Pye in Anne of Green Gables, Mrs Noye in Noye's Fludde, Susan in The Lion, the Witch and the Wardrobe, Mama in I Remember Mama, and Ophelia in Rags. Alexander has performed in many solo shows in Sydney and made her New York City performance debut at the Don't Tell Mama club in February 2010 with her solo show Alexander's Ragtime Band, which she also performed in Sydney.

Alexander is the creator and former musical/artistic director of TEMPUS (ARYA). Their performing credits include the 2007 Australian Idol Grand Final, the World Youth Day 2008 Opening Ceremony, and the Ian Moss/Wendy Matthews Never Say Never National Tour 2008.

Alexander's short documentary film Living Liza premiered late 2009 at the Cantor Film Center (Tisch School of the Arts) in New York and she produced her first feature film, Molière's Don Juan in New York in 2010.

Alexander has worked for Opera Australia, Andrew McManus Presents, MKG (this is MKG), Van Wyck & Van Wyck, the Federal Office of the AMEB (Australian Music Examinations Board), Supersonic (Australian Film Composers), the National Office of DMX Music, and with the head of Actors' Agents at RGM (Robyn Gardiner) Associates.

== Awards ==
- 2008: Nominations for 2008 Helpmann Awards:
  - Best Opera 2008 Helpmann Awards: Dead Man Walking, Presenter(s) Andrew McManus Presents and Alexander Productions
- 2009: Dame Joan Sutherland Award from the Australian American Association
