= Timothy Roberts =

Timothy Roberts may refer to:

- Timothy Roberts (conductor), English harpsichordist, musicologist and conductor
- Timothy Roberts (cricketer) (1978), English cricketer who played for Lancashire and Northamptonshire
