= L'Héritier =

L'Héritier is a surname. Notable people with the surname include:

- Jean L'Héritier (c. 1480–after 1551), French composer
- Charles Louis L'Héritier de Brutelle (1746–1800), French botanist
- Samuel-François Lhéritier (1772–1829), French cavalry general under Napoleon
