= Laurie Stras =

Musicologist and musician

Laurie Stras is a musicologist and musician, whose research interests range from the 16th century to modern popular music. She is professor emerita of the University of Southampton and has been a research professor at the University of Huddersfield.

Stras studied harpsichord, piano and singing at the Royal College of Music, London, and has a doctorate from Royal Holloway and Bedford New College where her thesis was on the madrigals of Marc'Antonio Ingegneri. She worked as a freelance singer and keyboard performer, and for four years was musical director of the Royal National Theatre. In 2018 she took up a three-year post of research professor at the University of Huddersfield.

Her research interests include early music, popular music and music in disability studies. Her publications include books on women's music in 16th-century Ferrara, Italy, and on "whiteness, femininity, adolescence and class in 1960s music", and she has published chapters or journal articles on a wide range of subjects including assistive technology in music, Connee Boswell (wheelchair-using jazz singer), Monteverdi, and eroticism in music, and revised the entry on Marc'Antonio Ingegneri in The New Grove Dictionary of Music and Musicians. In 2023-2024 she was supported by an emeritus Fellowship from the Leverhulme Trust to work on The Biffoli-Sostegni manuscript and Suor Maria Celeste Galilei at San Matteo in Arcetri, to be published by Cambridge University Press in its "Elements" series.

She is director of the women's vocal ensemble Musica Secreta, having been co-director with its founder Deborah Roberts until Roberts' death in 2024. Stras's work with the associated amateur and semi-professional choir Celestial Sirens gained her the "Individually-led project" award in the 2014 Engage Competition of the National Co-ordinating Centre for Public Engagement (NCCPE). Stras's research informs the ensemble's repertoire and performances, and she leads workshops such as "Music and Ritual in a 16th-century convent".

She received the American Musicological Society's 2019 Otto Kilkenny Award (given for "a musicological book of exceptional merit published by a scholar who is past the early stages of their career") for her 2018 work Women and Music in 16th Century Ferrara.

In 2017-2018 she served as president of the University of Southampton branch of the University and College Union.

Stras was one of the authors, all of whom "have experienced prolonged covid-19 symptoms, and have participated in various kinds of Long Covid advocacy", of an October 2020 opinion piece in The BMJ on the importance of using the "patient made" term Long Covid.

== Selected publications ==
- Stras, Laurie (2018). Women and Music in Sixteenth-Century Ferrara. Cambridge UP. ISBN 9781108815482.
- Stras, Laurie, ed. (2016). She's So Fine: Reflections on Whiteness, Femininity, Adolescence and Class in 1960s Music. London: Routledge. ISBN 9781315087986.
- Blackburn, Bonnie J.; Stras, Laurie, eds. (2016). Eroticism in early modern music. London New York: Routledge. ISBN 9781472443335.
- Stras, Laurie (2016). "Subhuman or Superhuman?: (Musical) Assistive Technology, Performance Enhancement, and the Aesthetic/Moral Debate". In Howe, Blake (ed.). The Oxford Handbook of Music and Disability Studies. pp. 176–190. doi:10.1093/oxfordhb/9780199331444.013.19.
- Ledbetter, Steven; Stras, Laurie (2001). "Ingegneri ..., Marc'Antonio". In Sadie, Stanley; Tyrrell, John (eds.). The New Grove Dictionary of Music and Musicians (2nd ed.). London: Macmillan. doi:10.1093/gmo/9781561592630.article.13795.
