= Manuel Cardoso (composer) =

Portuguese composer and organist

Manuel Cardoso (baptized 11 December 1566 – 24 November 1650) was a Portuguese composer and organist. With Duarte Lobo and John IV of Portugal, he represented the "golden age" of Portuguese polyphony.

Cardoso is not known to be related to an older contemporary composer of the same name; the precentor Manuel Cardoso, who published a book of Latin passions in Leiria in 1575.

Cardoso was born in Fronteira, near Portalegre, most likely in 1566. He attended the Colégio dos Moços do Coro, a choir school associated with the Évora cathedral, studying with Manuel Mendes and Cosme Delgado. In 1588 he joined the Carmelite order, taking his vows in 1589. In the early 1620s he was resident at the ducal household of Vila Viçosa, where he was befriended by the Duke of Barcelos—later to become King John IV. For most of his career he was the resident composer and organist at the Carmelite Convento do Carmo in Lisbon.

Cardoso's works are models of Palestrinian polyphony, and are written in a refined, precise style which completely ignores the development of the Baroque idiom elsewhere in Europe. His style has much in common with Tomás Luis de Victoria, in its careful treatment of dissonance, occasional polychoral writing, and frequent cross-relations, which were common among both Iberian and English composers of the time. Three books of masses survive; many of the works are based on motets written by King John IV himself, and others are based on motets by Palestrina. Cardoso was widely published, often with the help of King John IV to defray costs. Many of his works—especially the elaborate polychoral compositions, which probably were the most progressive—were destroyed in the Lisbon earthquake and fire of 1755.

== Recordings ==
- Frei Manuel Cardoso, Requiem. The Tallis Scholars, Peter Phillips. Gimell CDGIM 021
- Manuel Cardoso. Missa Miserere mihi Domine. Ensemble Vocal Européen, Philippe Herreweghe. Harmonia mundi HMA1951543, 1997.
- Manuel Cardoso, Missa pro defunctis. Schola Cantorum of Oxford, Jeremy Summerly. Naxos CD 8.550682, 1992
- Manuel Cardoso, Missa Secundi Toni, Magnificats, and Motets. Choir of Girton College, Cambridge, Gareth Wilson. Toccata Classics TOCC0476, 2018
- Manuel Cardoso, Requiem, Lamentations, Magnificat & motets. Cupertinos, Luís Toscano. Hyperion CDA68252, 2019.
