= Duarte Lobo =

Portuguese composer (1565 - 1646)

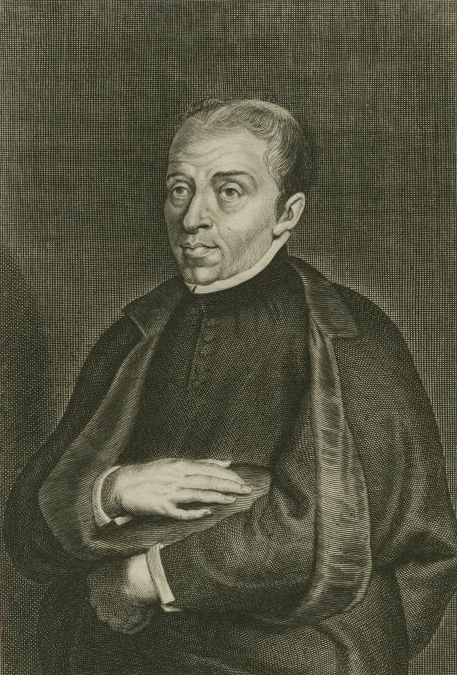
- Born: ca. 1565; Alcáçovas, Portugal
- Died: 24 September 1646; Portugal
- Occupation: Composer

Duarte Lobo (c. 1565 – 24 September 1646; Latinized as Eduardus Lupus) was a Portuguese composer of the late Renaissance and early Baroque. He was one of the most famous Portuguese composers of the time, together with Filipe de Magalhães, Manuel Cardoso, composers who all began their academic studies as students of Manuel Mendes. Along with John IV, King of Portugal, they represent the "golden age" of Portuguese polyphony.

== Life ==
Details of his life are sparse. He was born in Alcáçovas, in Alentejo, southern Portugal. He is known to have been a choir boy at Évora where he subsequently studied with Manuel Mendes. His first position was as mestre de capela of the cathedral of Évora sometime before 1589, he became maestro di cappella at the Hospital Real, Lisbon. By 1591 he was appointed as mestre de capela at the cathedral in Lisbon, a position he held till 1639. This was the most prestigious musical appointment in the country.

He also served as director of the Seminary of São Bartolomeu, and was also a professor of music at the 'Colégio do Claustro da Sé' (College at the Holy See Cloisters) in Lisbon, where he taught Manuel Machado. He was also the teacher of António Fernandes who wrote the first music theory treatise published in the Portuguese language.

While chronologically his life overlapped with the beginning of the Baroque music era, he was a rather conservative composer who followed the techniques of the Renaissance masters of the previous generation. Palestrina's polyphonic style played a crucial role in his compositions throughout his life.

== Recordings ==
- Portuguese Requiem Masses, Missa pro defunctis. Schola Cantorum of Oxford, Jeremy Summerly. Naxos 8.550682
- Duarte Lôbo, Requiem. The Tallis Scholars, Peter Phillips. Gimell CDGIM 028
- Pater Peccavi, Missa Veni Domine. The Marian Consort, Rory McCleery. Delphian DCD34205

== Musical opus ==
- Published by Plantin in Antwerp, his six books of sacred music include masses, responsories, antiphons, Magnificats, and motets.

== Publications ==
- 1602 Osuscula
- 1603 Officium Defunctorum
- 1605 Cantica Beatae Virginis (16 Magnificat for four voices)
- 1621 Liber Missarum I (eight-voice Requiem)
- 1639 Liber Missarum II (six-voice Requiem, Missa Vox clamantis)
