= Alonso Lobo =

Spanish composer (c.1555–1617)

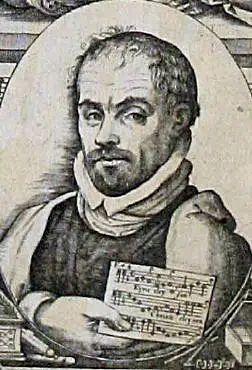
Alonso Lobo

Alonso Lobo (February 25, 1555 (baptised) – April 5, 1617) was a Spanish composer of the late Renaissance. Although not as famous as Tomás Luis de Victoria, he was highly regarded at the time, and Victoria himself considered him to be his equal.

== Biography ==
Lobo was born in Osuna, and after being a choirboy at the cathedral in Seville, he received a degree at the University of Osuna, and took a position as a canon at Osuna´s collegiate church sometime before 1591. In that year, the Seville Cathedral appointed him as assistant to Francisco Guerrero, and he later became maestro de capilla during Guerrero's leave of absence. In 1593, Toledo Cathedral hired him as maestro de capilla; he remained there until 1604, when he returned to Seville, where he died.

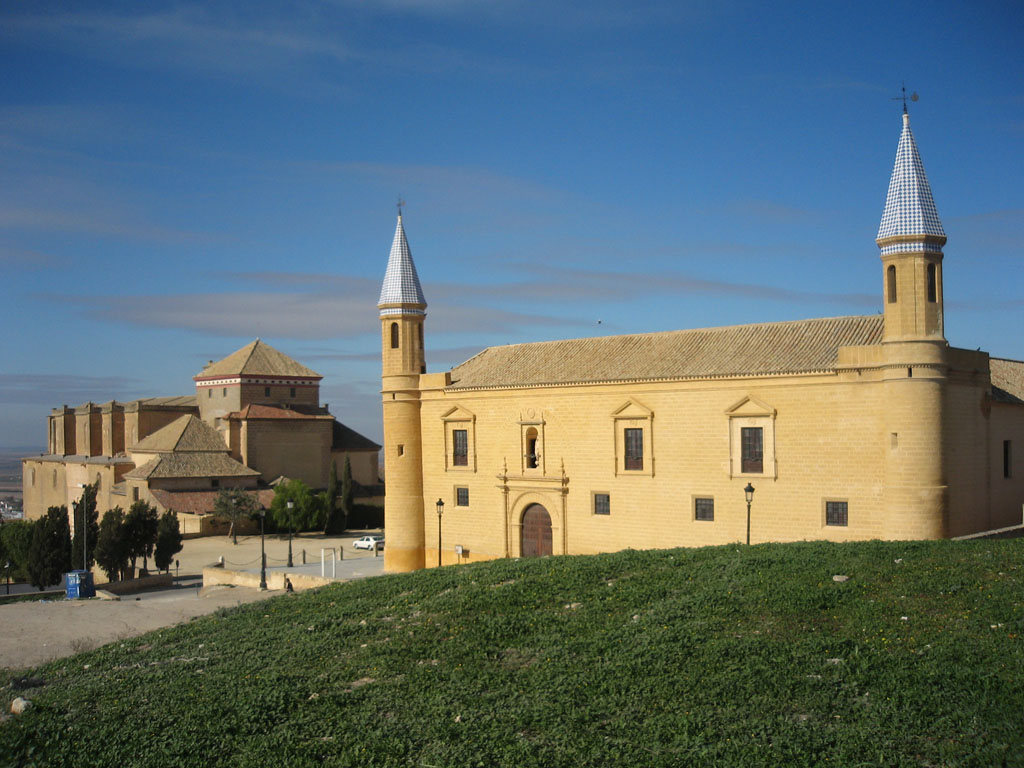
The University and Collegiate Church of Osuna

Lobo's music combines the smooth contrapuntal technique of Palestrina with the sombre intensity of Victoria. Some of his music also uses polychoral techniques, which were common in Italy around 1600, though Lobo never used more than two choirs (contemporary choral music of the Venetian school often used many more — the Gabrielis often wrote for as many choirs as there were choir-lofts at St Mark's Basilica). Lobo was influential far beyond the borders of his native Spain: in Portugal, and as far away as Mexico, for the next hundred years or more he was considered to be one of the finest Spanish composers.

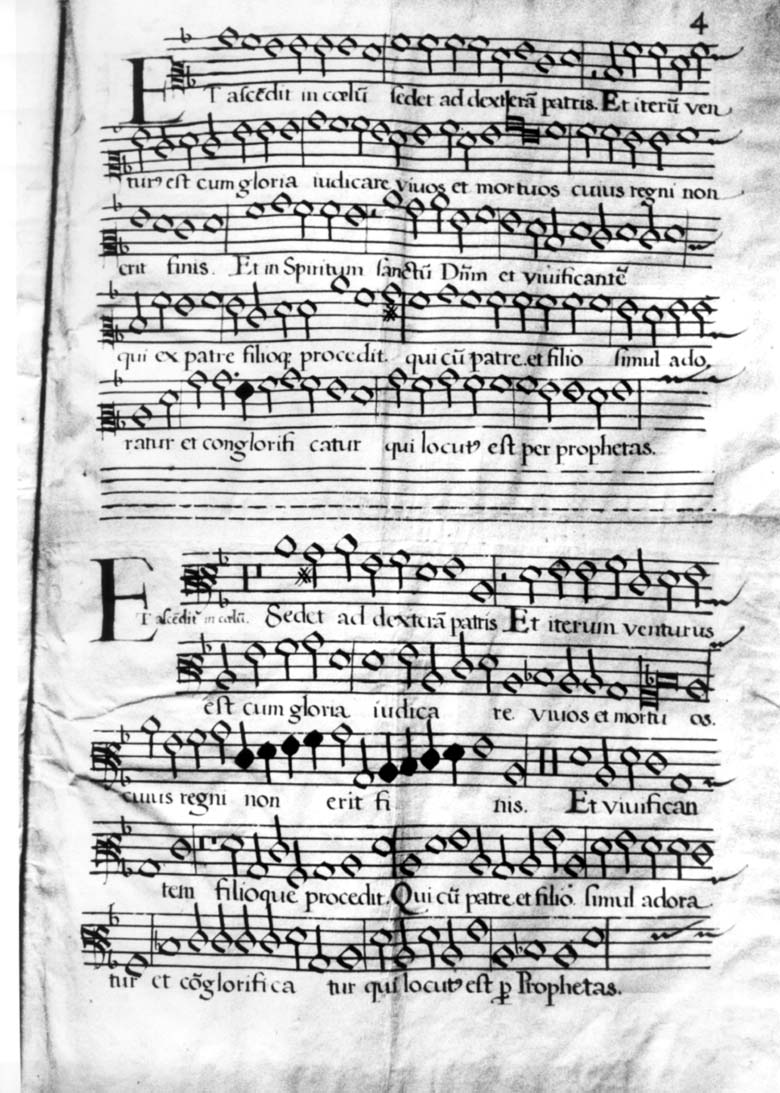
Alonso Lobo's "Credo romano", El Escorial.

His works include masses and motets, three Passion settings, Lamentations, psalms and hymns, as well as a Miserere for 12 voices (which has since become lost). His best-known work, Versa est in luctum, was written on the death of Philip II in 1598. No secular or instrumental music by Lobo is known to survive today.

== Publications ==
- 1602, Madrid, Liber primus missarum

== Recordings ==
- Lamentations, Choir of Westminster Cathedral directed by Martin Baker on Hyperion CDA68106
- Missa Simile est regnum caelorum, Missa O rex gloriae and Lamentations, Choir of King's College London directed by David Trendell on Sanctuary Gaudeamus, 2002
- Vivo ego, dicit Dominus recorded by Musicaficta Ensemble, directed by Andrea Angelini
- Versa est in luctum & Lamentationes Ieremiae Prophetae, on the disc Santiago a Cappella, The Monteverdi Choir, directed by John Eliot Gardiner on Universal Classics
- Versa est in luctum & Lamentations & Libera Me, on the disc The Golden Age, Siglo de oro, released 2008 by The King's Singers on Signum Records
- Versa est in luctum & Libera me, Domine, on the disc Mortuus est Philippus Rex, Choir of Westminster Cathedral, London, directed by James O'Donnell (Hyperion CDA67046)
- Versa est in luctum, on the disc Morales - Requiem, music for Philip II, Gabrieli Consort, directed by Paul McCreesh (ARCHIV produktion, 457 597-2)
- Versa est in luctum, with the Victoria Requiem, The Tallis Scholars, directed by Peter Phillips (Gimell Records, CDGIM 012)
- Missa Maria Magdalene, with the motet Maria Magdalene by Guerrero, The Tallis Scholars, directed by Peter Phillips (Gimell, CDGIM 031)
- Versa est in luctum, on the disc Sing Joyfully, The Hogan Ensemble, directed by Simon Hogan on Convivium Records, 2010.
