= Lheritier =

The name Lhéritier could refer to:

- Jean l'Héritier (c. 1480 – after 1551), a French composer of the Renaissance
- Marie-Jeanne L'Héritier (1664–1734), an aristocratic French writer and salonnière of the late 17th century
- Samuel-François Lhéritier (1772–1829), a French general of the Napoleonic Wars
