= Deborah Roberts (soprano) =

British singer

- Born: 10 May 1952; Croydon, London, England
- Died: 9 September 2024 (aged 72); Brighton, England
- Education: University of Leicester; University of Nottingham
- Occupations: Musician, musicologist, conductor, teacher
- Partners: James Erber; Maurice Shipsey
- Children: 1
- Website: bremf.org.uk

Deborah Roberts BEM (10 May 1952 – 9 September 2024) was a British soprano. She sang with The Tallis Scholars for 30 years and co-founded the Brighton Early Music Festival (BREMF) and Musica Secreta.

== Personal life and education ==
Roberts was born in Croydon to Mollie Weaver and Edwin Roberts. She was one of four children. She attended Lady Edridge Girls High School, Croydon, after which she took a music degree at the University of Leicester, studying with David Munrow. She went on to gain a master's degree in Renaissance and Baroque music from the University of Nottingham in 1975.

She married composer James Erber in 1981. The marriage produced one son and ended in divorce. She moved to Brighton in 1996. Roberts was awarded a British Empire Medal for contributions to music weeks before she went into hospice care. She died of breast cancer on 9 September 2024. She asked for donations to be made to BREMF in her memory. An interview with Roberts appeared on BBC Radio 4's Last Word programme on 27 September 2024.

== Performing career ==
=== Tallis Scholars ===
Roberts joined the Tallis Scholars in 1977. She was known for singing the soprano solo line in Allegri's Miserere with its high Cs, recording the part for the choir's 1980 and 2007 albums. She also sang it at the Sistine Chapel for the unveiling of Rosselli's Last Supper. She appeared in over 1,200 concerts with Tallis Scholars and sang on over 60 recordings with the groups.

=== Musica Secreta ===
Together with Tessa Bonner, Roberts co-founded Musica Secreta, a vocal group dedicated to the music of "early modern women" in 1991. The group released nine albums, including Dangerous Graces (2002), Sacred Hearts, Secret Music (2009) and Lucrezia Borgia's Daughter (2016).

=== Other ensembles ===
As well as the Tallis Scholars, Roberts performed with many other ensembles including The Consort of Musicke, The English Concert, London Baroque, the Deller Consort, the Taverner Choir, and The King's Consort.

== Brighton ==
Roberts became director of the Brighton Consort in 1998. She co-founded the Brighton Early Music Festival (BREMF) with Clare Norburn in 2002. Through BREMF she also created several new ensembles: BREMF Consort of Voices, Celestial Sirens, BREMF Community Choir and the BREMF Players. Notable productions included 1589 Florentine Intermedi (2012), Feast of ols (2019), The Whispering Dome (2020) and La Liberazione di Ruggiero (2022).
