= Brighton Early Music Festival =

- Genre: Early music
- Locations: Brighton and Hove, England
- Years active: 2002–present
- Founded: 2002
- Website: http://www.bremf.org.uk/

Brighton Early Music Festival is an annual English music festival which includes concerts, workshops and other educational events in Brighton and Hove. The festival explores the connections between classical music, folk music and world music from the Middle Ages until the early 19th century. The organisation supports and promotes musicians who specialise in historically informed performance, performing on period instruments and exploring the sound world that composers of the past would have had in mind when writing their music.

The festival was established in 2002 with a small pilot series. It has been programmed and managed by Co-Artistic Directors and sopranos, Deborah Roberts and Clare Norburn, with Norburn stepping down in 2017. In 2003, the festival became formally constituted and set up as a registered charity. The festival is supported by a dedicated committee of volunteers who are responsible for all areas of managing the festival.

Brighton Early Music Festival takes place each autumn from October to November in venues across Brighton and Hove, including St Bartholomew's Church, Brighton, The Royal Pavilion, St George's Church, Brighton, The Old Market and the Brighton Dome complex. Each year, BBC Radio 3 broadcasts a number of concerts from the festival.

== Programmes ==
On 10 October 2025, the Brighton Early Music Festival (BREMF) unveiled its selected emerging artists for the year, including sopranos such as Sumei Bao-Smith, Emilia Bertolini, and Emily Brown Gibson. They featured in the 'Duval Les Genies' programme alongside other vocal soloists. This development scheme, which has supported professional early music musicians since 2007, provided mentorship and live performance opportunities, thereby fostering young talent within early music in Britain. The initiative has historically attracted over 200 participants. The programme is scheduled to culminate with a showcase on 18 October, highlighting various ensembles and soloists.

== Performers ==
Artists who have appeared in the festival include:

- Emma Kirkby (soprano)
- The London Handel Players
- His Majestys Sagbutts & Cornetts
- The Orlando Consort
- Alison Bury (violin)
- Ex Cathedra
- I Fagiolini
- Orchestra of the Age of Enlightenment
- The Sixteen
- Red Priest
- The Tallis Scholars
- Florilegium
- Joglaresa
- Palisander
- Le Baroque Nomade
- Vox Animae
- The Brook Street Band
- The Harp Consort
