= Stras =

Stras is a surname. Notable people with the surname include:

- David Stras (born 1974), American judge
- Laurie Stras (fl. 2025), British musicologist
