= Honor Sheppard =

English soprano (1931-2021)

- Sheppard from a 1959 newspaper article
- Born: Elizabeth Honor Sheppard; 23 December 1931 (age 93); Leeds, United Kingdom
- Died: 29 May 2021 (aged 89); Cheshire, United Kingdom
- Education: Royal Manchester College of Music
- Occupations: Classical soprano in: Oratorio; Classical music
- Spouses: John Lawrenson (m. 1959) Robert Elliott (m. 1965)
- Children: 2

Honor Sheppard (23 December 1931 - 29 May 2021) was a classical soprano best known for singing oratorios and the Baroque repertoire. She was the longest serving soprano of the Deller Consort. She took part in the first professional performance of Havergal Brian's Gothic Symphony at the Royal Albert Hall in 1966.

== Personal life and education ==
Elizabeth Honor Sheppard was born in Leeds to George Sheppard, organist at St Stephen's Church, Kirkstall and Winifred May Tonkin, an accompanist. She had one sibling. She began studying music at the age of six and attended Leeds Girls' High School.

In 1952, while singing Bach's Christmas Oratorio at a church in Leeds, she was 'discovered' by Yorkshire Symphony Orchestra's conductor Maurice Miles. He encouraged her to apply to the Royal Manchester College of Music (RMCM), where she studied singing with Elsie Thurston, full time for five years and subsequently part time.

She married singer John Lawrenson in 1959. After their marriage ended, she married fellow RMCM student and harpsichordist Robert Elliott in 1965. They had two children and lived at The Firs, Altrincham (which had previously been owned by conductor Hans Richter). She earned both teaching and performing diplomas from RMCM in her third year, and in her fourth year (1956) she won the Curtis Gold Medal for Singing.

== Teaching ==
By 1959, Sheppard was on the staff at RMCM. Among others, she taught Tessa Bonner, Lynne Dawson and Sasha Johnson Manning.

== Performing ==
In March 1953, she sang the role of 'off-stage voice' in a live BBC radio broadcast of Ralph Vaughan Williams's new work Sinfonia Antartica at Huddersfield Town Hall, which had been premiered in January. This was Sheppard's first broadcast.

She sang with The Hallé, the London Symphony Orchestra and the Royal Liverpool Philharmonic Orchestra, and appeared at the Royal Albert Hall, Aldeburgh Festival and Leeds Festival. She would also perform recitals as a "celebrity couple" with her first husband John Lawrenson.

She joined the Deller Consort in 1961, eventually becoming its longest serving soprano. Of her career with the group she said, "There was a period when I could have established myself as a concert singer. The fact that I stayed to work constantly with Alfred [Deller] speaks for itself. I am very much drawn to the music we both loved."

In 1967 she appeared as the soloist in a world premiere of Havergal Brian's Symphony No. 4 "Das Siegeslied" (1932–33). It was broadcast by the BBC and included the Halifax Choral Society, the Leeds Philharmonic Choir, the BBC Northern Symphony Orchestra, all conducted by Maurice Handford. She gave the first performance of Alexander Goehr's Psalm IV Op. 38a in July 1976 at the City of London Festival.

== Recordings ==
A selection of recordings include:

Year	Album	Ensemble	Conductor
1956	Il ballo delle ingrate: Lamento d'Arianna	London Chamber Players	Alfred Deller
1964	Handel: Alexander's Feast	Oriana Concert Choir and Orchestra	Alfred Deller
1966	Havergal Brian: Symphony No. 1in D Minor	BBC Symphony Orchestra	Adrian Boult
1970	William Croft Vocal and Instrumental Chamber Music	Marjorie Lavers, Robert Elliott	
1971	Purcell and his Contemporaries	with Robert Elliott, harpsichord	
1972	Handel from Halifax	Halifax Choral Society	Donald Hunt
1974	Thomas Arne: Songs and Sonatas	with Robert Elliott, harpsichord	
1974	Airs baroques, airs anglais		Alfred Deller
1975	Songs and Sonatas	Royal Northern College of Music	
1977	Havergal Brian's Gothic Symphony	BBC Symphony Orchestra	Adrian Boult
1979	Ode for the birthday of Queen Anne	Oriana Concert Orchestra and Choir	Alfred Deller
