= Susan Addison =

British classical musician (born 1955)

Susan "Sue" Addison (born 1955) is an English performer and professor of the sackbut, tenor trombone, and other early trombones. She specializes in playing historical music using authentic instruments of the age. She was a founding member and performed as the principal trombone player for the Orchestra of the Age of Enlightenment.

She was also a founding member of His Majestys Sagbutts and Cornetts, and has played with them for 40 years.

== Biography ==
Susan Addison was born in 1955 in Louth, Lincolnshire and attended Monksdyke High School. She has said she was fifteen when she started learning the trombone, and only chose that instrument as that was the only one available to play at her school. She is a performer on the sackbut, tenor trombone, and other early trombones, and is a specialist in using authentic instruments of the age to play historical music. After studying the trombone at the Royal College of Music London, Addison joined the City of Birmingham Symphony Orchestra where she remained for four and a half years.

She was a founder member of His Majestys Sagbutts and Cornetts in 1982 and has performed with the group for 40 years. She was a founding member of the Orchestra of the Age of Enlightenment and performed with them as their principal trombone player. She has conducted research on the music and instruments of the fourteenth to the eighteenth centuries, and in 2009, she released a recording using the actual trombone of famous composer Edward Elgar after she discovered it at the Royal College of Music. She is also principal for the Gabrieli Consort and Players and Amsterdam-based Orchestra of the Eighteenth Century. She was awarded an Hon.RAM from the Royal Academy of Music in 2002.

Addison teaches at the Royal College of Music, the Royal Academy of Music, the Royal Northern College of Music, Trinity College of Music and the Birmingham Conservatoire.
