= Caroline Trevor =

English contralto

- Born: 1958 (age 67–68); England
- Occupation: Classical contralto
- Organizations: The Tallis Scholars; Taverner Consort

Caroline Trevor (born 1958) is an English contralto, focused on early music and Baroque music in historically informed performance. She has been one of two alto voices in the award-winning ensemble The Tallis Scholars since 1982.

== Career ==
Trevor's first musical experience was singing in a church choir led by her father. She has performed frequently with the singers and players of the Taverner Consort, conducted by Andrew Parrott. They recorded Bach cantatas such as Christ lag in Todes Banden, BWV 4.

Since March 1982 Trevor has been one of two regular singers in the alto section of the a cappella ensemble The Tallis Scholars. As of 3 November 2003, she had performed 800 concerts with the group, which had then given 1297 concerts; their 2000th concert was in September 2015. She is married to the ensemble's founder and director Peter Phillips. The Tallis Scholars have focused on rarely performed music from the Renaissance to contemporary. One example is their recording of three masses based on the same "Western Wind" secular tune, Western Wind Masses, by Tudor composers John Taverner, Christopher Tye and John Sheppard. She has performed internationally with the ensemble, which has won prizes including Gramophone Awards during her tenure. The Tallis Scholars celebrated their 25th anniversary in 1998 with a tour that included concerts at New York's Church of St. Ignatius Loyola, singing music by English composers of the Tudor period (Thomas Tallis, William Byrd, and William Mundy, among others), and by continental composers such as Palestrina and Nicolas Gombert. James R. Oestreich of The New York Times noted that the group's "characteristic sound, bright, clear and balanced, has become a model for many other choirs".

Trevor appeared as a soloist on a 1989 recording, Elizabethan Christmas Anthems, with the ensembles Red Byrd and the Rose Consort of Viols, singing William Byrd's Lullaby. She subsequently was the soloist with the Rose Consort of Viols and lutenist Jacob Heringman on a 1992 recording, John Dowland's Lachrimae. In 2011, she was the first woman to be engaged by St Paul's Cathedral in London for a singing position in the traditionally male cathedral choir, breaking the tradition of male voices only which had been observed for nine centuries.
