= Manuel Mendes =

Portuguese composer and teacher

Manuel Mendes (or Manoel Mendes; c. 1547 – 24 September 1605) was a Portuguese composer and teacher of the Renaissance. While his music remains obscure, he was important as the teacher of several of the composers of the golden age of Portuguese polyphony, including Duarte Lobo and Manuel Cardoso.

He was born in Lisbon, and studied music with Cosme Delgado in Évora as a youth. Later he was appointed mestre de capela at the cathedral in Portalegre, but returned to Évora to receive a bachelor's degree in 1575. In 1575 he became a priest and teacher of the choirboys in the cathedral. His students included some of the most famous Portuguese composers of the early 17th century, such as Duarte Lobo, Manuel Cardoso, Filipe de Magalhães and Manuel Rebelo. See: List of music students by teacher: K to M#Manuel Mendes. He died at Évora.

While Mendes was evidently a prolific composer, his works are only extant in manuscript. He was famous in the 16th century, and his music traveled to Spain as well as Mexico, where he was highly regarded.
