= Gramophone Hall of Fame =

- Awarded for: Contribution to the UK classical music record industry
- Sponsored by: Gramophone Magazine
- Date: 2011
- Country: United Kingdom
- Website: gramophone.co.uk/artists

Launched by Gramophone magazine in late 2011, the Gramophone Hall of Fame is an annual listing of the people (artists, producers, engineers, A&R directors and label founders) who have contributed to the classical music record industry. Fifty individuals and ensembles entered the Hall of Fame in its first year. A special edition of the magazine (May 2012 issue) celebrated this new initiative, and the list was first published online on 6 April 2012.

== Voting ==
Entrants are chosen by a public vote on Gramophone's website, with voters able to choose from a shortlist of over 200 industry figures and musicians chosen by the magazine's editors. The list is intended to be updated on a yearly basis, again, by public vote.

== Entrants ==
=== 2012 entrants ===
==== Conductors ====
Claudio Abbado
John Barbirolli
Daniel Barenboim
Thomas Beecham
Leonard Bernstein
Pierre Boulez
Wilhelm Furtwängler
John Eliot Gardiner
Nikolaus Harnoncourt
Herbert von Karajan
Carlos Kleiber
Otto Klemperer
Simon Rattle
Georg Solti
Arturo Toscanini

==== Singers ====
Angela Gheorghiu
Janet Baker
Cecilia Bartoli
Jussi Björling
Maria Callas
Enrico Caruso
Joyce DiDonato
Plácido Domingo
Dietrich Fischer-Dieskau
Birgit Nilsson
Luciano Pavarotti
Elisabeth Schwarzkopf
Joan Sutherland

==== Keyboard players ====
Martha Argerich
Claudio Arrau
Daniel Barenboim
Alfred Brendel
Glenn Gould
Vladimir Horowitz
Murray Perahia
Maurizio Pollini
Sviatoslav Richter
Arthur Rubinstein
Lang Lang

==== String/brass players ====
Pablo Casals
Jacqueline du Pré
Jascha Heifetz
Yehudi Menuhin
David Oistrakh
Itzhak Perlman
Mstislav Rostropovich

==== Ensembles ====
Beaux Arts Trio
Takács Quartet

==== Producers/record label executives ====
John Culshaw
Walter Legge
Ted Perry

=== 2013 entrants ===
==== Conductors ====
Karl Böhm
Adrian Boult
Sergiu Celibidache
Colin Davis
Gustavo Dudamel
Carlo Maria Giulini
Bernard Haitink
Mariss Jansons
Rafael Kubelík
James Levine
Charles Mackerras
Zubin Mehta
George Szell
Bruno Walter

==== Singers ====
Montserrat Caballé
Renée Fleming
Thomas Hampson
Anna Netrebko
Leontyne Price
Bryn Terfel
Fritz Wunderlich

==== Pianists ====
Leif Ove Andsnes
Vladimir Ashkenazy
Emil Gilels
Wilhelm Kempff
Arturo Benedetti Michelangeli
Sergei Rachmaninoff
Grigory Sokolov

==== String/brass/woodwind players ====
Maurice André
Julian Bream
James Galway
Heinz Holliger
Steven Isserlis
Yo-Yo Ma
Wynton Marsalis
Albrecht Mayer
Anne-Sophie Mutter
Emmanuel Pahud
Jean-Pierre Rampal
Jordi Savall
Andrés Segovia
John Williams

==== Vocal and instrumental ensembles ====
Alban Berg Quartet
Amadeus Quartet
The King's Singers
Tallis Scholars

==== Producers/engineers/record label executives ====
Bernard Coutaz
Fred Gaisberg
Klaus Heymann
Goddard Lieberson
Kenneth Wilkinson

=== More recent entrants ===
==== Conductors ====
Pierre Boulez
Benjamin Britten
Riccardo Chailly
Christopher Hogwood
Neville Marriner
Yevgeny Mravinsky
Riccardo Muti
Eugene Ormandy
Antonio Pappano
Trevor Pinnock
Fritz Reiner
Leopold Stokowski
Michael Tilson Thomas

==== Singers ====
Thomas Allen
Victoria de los Ángeles
Jussi Bjorling
José Carreras
Feodor Chaliapin
Kathleen Ferrier
Kirsten Flagstad
Nicolai Ghiaurov
Tito Gobbi
Marilyn Horne
Hans Hotter

==== Pianists ====
Friedrich Gulda
Marc-André Hamelin
Angela Hewitt
Stephen Hough
Evgeny Kissin
Gustav Leonhardt
Lang Lang
Dinu Lipatti
Radu Lupu
Arturo Benedetti Michelangeli
András Schiff
Artur Schnabel
Mitsuko Uchida

==== String/brass/woodwind players ====
Dennis Brain
Kyung Wha Chung
Arthur Grumiaux
Fritz Kreisler
Gidon Kremer
Nathan Milstein

==== Producers/record label executives ====
Emile Berliner
C Robert Fine
Alain Lanceron
Edward Lewis
Richard Mohr
