= Timothy Roberts (conductor) =

British musician

Timothy Roberts is a British organist, harpsichordist and conductor. He was born in Hampstead, north London, on 25 July, 1953. Leading his own ensemble, Invocation, Roberts made a series of pioneering recordings of Georgian era vocal music for Hyperion Records. He has also directed His Majesty's Consort of Voices and His Majestys Sagbutts & Cornetts.

== Selected discography ==
- Thomas Moore's Irish Melodies with Invocation
- The Romantic Muse with Invocation
- Andrea Gabrieli: Missa Pater peccavi with His Majesty's Consort of Voices, His Majesty's Sagbutts & Cornetts
