= Cosme Delgado =

Portuguese Renaissance composer

Cosme Delgado (c. 1530, Cartaxo – 17 September 1596, Évora) was a Portuguese Renaissance composer. He was born in Cartaxo and held the positions of cantor and mestre de capela at the Cathedral of Évora, where he was well renowned both as a composer and as a teacher. The most important of his students was Manuel Mendes, a relevant figure of the Portuguese polyphonic school. His works – masses, motets, lamentations, and one theorical essay – were left by testament to the Convent of Espinheiro in Évora.
