= Marc'Antonio Ingegneri =

Italian composer

Marc'Antonio Ingegneri (also spelled Ingegnieri, Ingignieri, Ingignero, Inzegneri) (c. 1535 or 1536 – 1 July 1592) was an Italian composer of the late Renaissance. He was born in Verona and died in Cremona. Even though he spent most of his life working in northern Italy, because of his stylistic similarity to Palestrina he is often considered to be a member of the Roman School of polyphonic church music. He is also famous as the teacher of Claudio Monteverdi.

Not much is known about his early life, but he probably had family from Venice, and he likely studied with Cipriano de Rore at Parma, and Vincenzo Ruffo at Verona. Sometime around 1570 he moved to Cremona, and established a reputation there as a composer and instrumentalist. He may have been an organist, and is known to have been a string player. In 1581 he became maestro di cappella of the cathedral there, and he apparently remained in this position for the rest of his life. While at this position he is known to have taught Claudio Monteverdi, who became important to the transition into the Baroque period.

Ingegneri was close friends with Bishop Nicolò Sfondrato, later Pope Gregory XIV, who was intimately involved with the reforms of the Counter-Reformation and the Council of Trent, and this influence is present in his music, which usually shows the simplification and clarity of the Palestrina style. Indeed, his book of twenty-seven Responsoria was long misattributed to Palestrina. However, some of his music quite ignores the reformist dicta of the Council; most notorious is a four-voice motet Noe noe, which is a double canon by inversion, in which it would require an exceedingly keen ear to hear the text: and intelligibility of the text was the one demand made by the Council of Trent of any composer of sacred polyphony.

His masses are simple, short, and relatively homophonic, often outdoing Palestrina for clarity and simplicity. His madrigals tend to be conservative, frankly ignoring the innovations of composers such as Luzzaschi and Marenzio who were experimenting with vivid chromaticism and word-painting around the same time.

He wrote two books of masses, in 1573 and 1587; at least three books of motets (others may have been lost); and eight books of madrigals, for four to six voices.

== List of works ==
=== Sacred works ===
- Liber primus missarum (1573),
- Sacrarum cantionum for 5 voices (1576)
- Sacrarum cantionum for 4 voices (1586),
- Liber secundus missarum for 5 voices (1587)
- Responsoria hebdomadae sanctae, Benedictus and improperia ... and Miserere for 4 and 6 voices (1588)
- Lamentationes Hieremiae for 4 voices (1588),
- Liber sacrarum cantionum for 16 voices and instruments (1596, Sacrae cantiones ... liber primus for 6 voices (1591),
- Liber secundus hymnorum for 4 voices (1606)
- Super flumina Babylonis

also a few other works published in collections.

=== Secular works ===
Il primo libro dei madrigali for 5 and 8 voices (lost), Il secondo libro dei madrigali for 5 voices (1572), also 9 other books of madrigals plus 10 others in various collections.

== Recordings ==
CDs of his music are published by Toccata Music, performed by the Choir of Girton College, Cambridge under the direction of Gareth Wilson.

== Sources ==
- "Marc Antonio Ingegneri", in The New Grove Dictionary of Music and Musicians, ed. Stanley Sadie. 20 vol. London, Macmillan Publishers Ltd., 1980. ISBN 1-56159-174-2
- Gustave Reese, Music in the Renaissance. New York, W.W. Norton & Co., 1954. ISBN 0-393-09530-4
- Denis Arnold, Monteverdi. London, J.M. Dent & Sons Ltd, 1975. ISBN 0-460-03155-4
- "Girton College Chapel Choir release new album for 2022 | Girton College". www.girton.cam.ac.uk.
