= Choir of Girton College, Cambridge =

English Anglican choir

- Choir
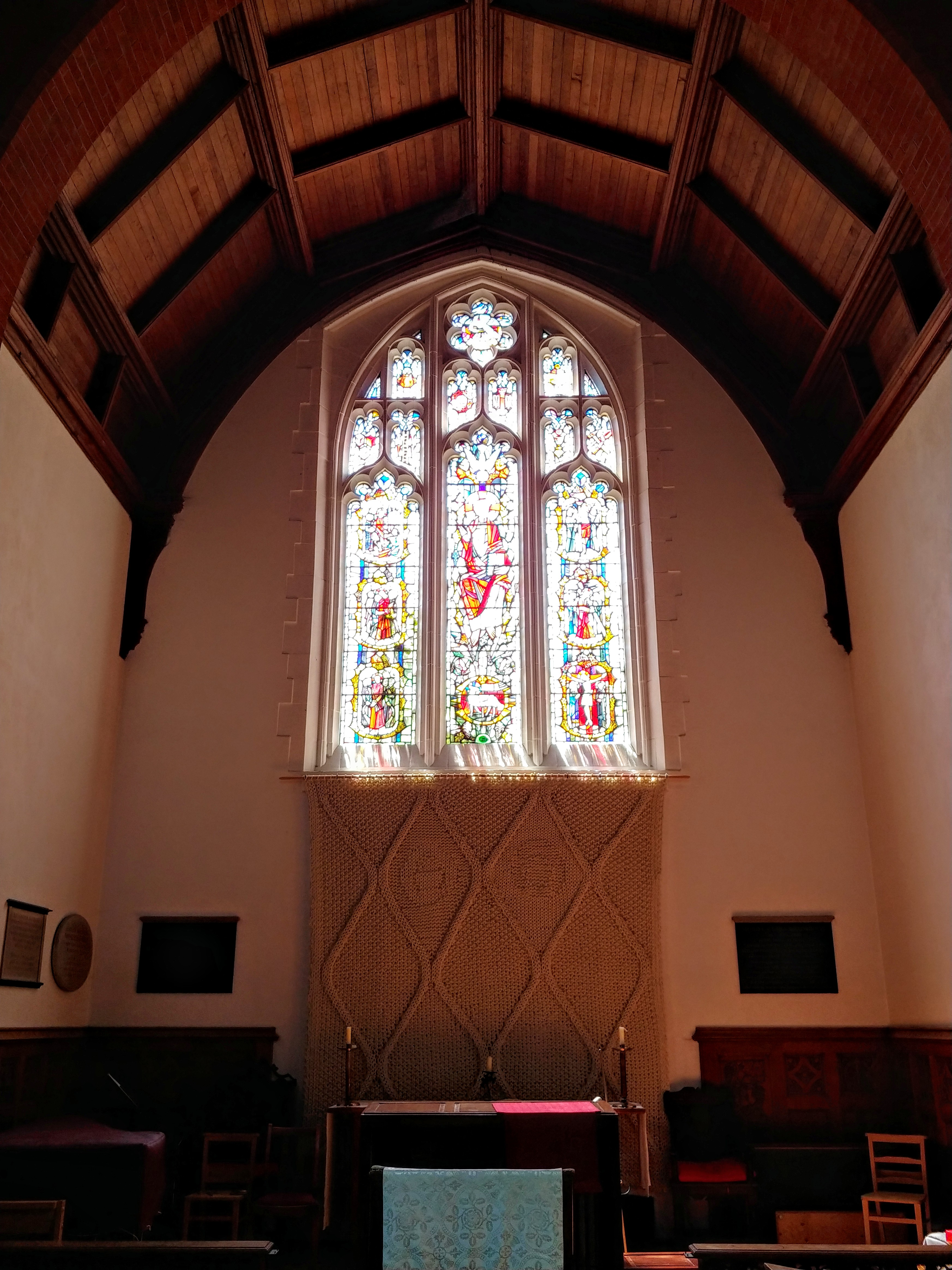
- East Window of Girton College Chapel
- Members: Around 25 students, predominantly of Girton College, Cambridge
- Music director: Gareth Wilson
- Website: Girton College Chapel Choir

The Choir of Girton College, Cambridge, is an English chapel choir in the Anglican musical tradition. As the choir of Girton College, in the University of Cambridge, it has been mixed since men were first admitted to the college in 1979. It is currently led by theologian and composer Gareth Wilson and has become well known in recent years for recordings and performances of the late-renaissance Italian composer Marc'Antonio Ingegneri (c. 1535 or 1536 – 1 July 1592).

The choir exists in a wider Cambridge tradition of collegiate chapel choirs, others including those at Sidney Sussex, St John's, King's, and Trinity. The location of the college in Girton village, outside of the city of Cambridge itself, has led to the choir being dubbed "arguably the finest Cambridge choir outside of Cambridge".

The choir sings evensong on Sundays and compline on Tuesdays in the college chapel, also performing concerts and singing grace for significant college occasions. Unusually for Cambridge, the Girton choir does not wear cassocks nor surplices, instead using academic gowns. These undergraduate gowns have a distinctive cut, designed to allow for ease of cycling, given the distance from the main college site to central Cambridge.

The chapel organ, installed in 2002, is widely respected as an instrument throughout the university, and the college maintains two organ scholars (also members of the choir) who play for services and other events.

Previous directors of chapel music have included Dr Martin Ennis, who remains head of music at Girton, and Jonathan Rathbone.

Recent international tours have included to Palestine and Israel (2019), Lombardy (2018 & 2023), Portugal (2024), and to Czechia and Bavaria (2022 & 2025).
