= Gramophone (magazine) =

British monthly classical music magazine

- Cover of the Awards 2024 issue, featuring Michael Tilson Thomas
- Editor: Martin Cullingford
- Categories: Classical music
- Frequency: Monthly
- First issue: 1923
- Company: Mark Allen Group
- Country: United Kingdom
- Based in: London, England
- Language: English
- Website: www.gramophone.co.uk
- ISSN: 0017-310X

Gramophone (known as The Gramophone prior to 1970) is a magazine published monthly in London, devoted to classical music, particularly to reviews of recordings. It was founded in 1923 by the Scottish author Compton Mackenzie who continued to edit the magazine until 1961. It was acquired by Haymarket in 1999. In 2013 the Mark Allen Group became the publisher.

The magazine presents the Gramophone Awards each year to the classical recordings which it considers the finest in a variety of categories.

On its website Gramophone claims to be: "The world's authority on classical music since 1923." This used to appear on the front cover of every issue; recent editions have changed the wording to "The world's best classical music reviews."

Its circulation, including digital subscribers, was 24,380 in 2014.

== Listings and the Gramophone Hall of Fame ==
Apart from the annual Gramophone Classical Music Awards, each month features a dozen recordings as Gramophone Editor's Choice (now Gramophone Choice). Then, in the annual Christmas edition, there is a review of the year's recordings where each critic selects four or five recordings, and these selections make up the Gramophone Critics' Choice. In April 2012, Gramophone launched its Hall of Fame, an annual listing of the men and women (artists, producers, engineers, A&R directors and label founders) who have contributed to the classical records industry. The first 50 were revealed in the May 2012 issue and on Gramophone's website, and each year will see another intake into the Hall of Fame.

== Archive ==
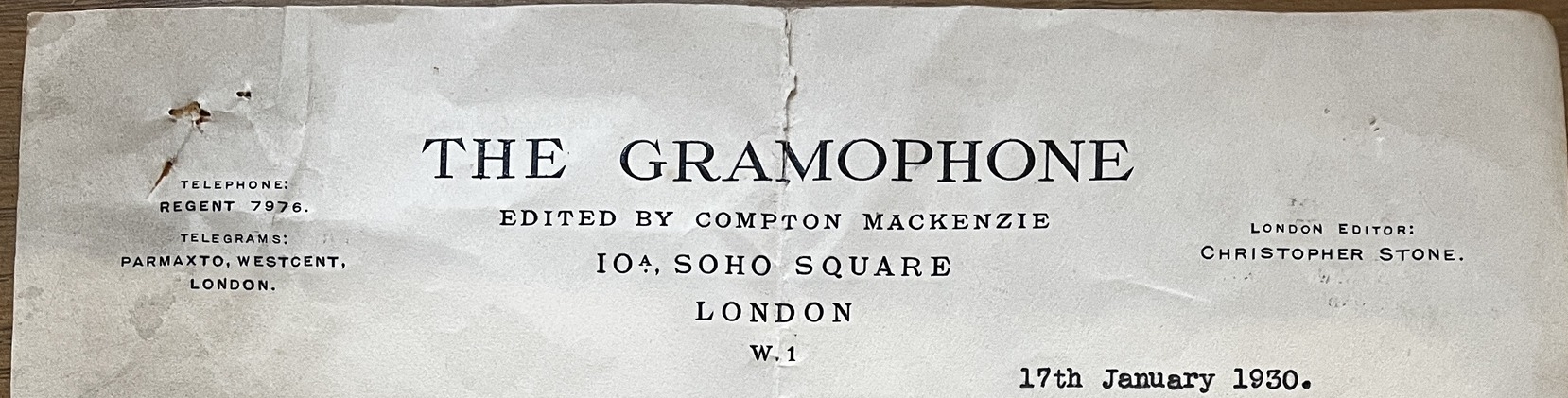
Letterhead used in 1930

In late 2012, Gramophone announced the launch of a new archive service. Subscribers to the digital edition are now able to read complete PDFs of every issue of the magazine dating back to its launch in 1923; previously only OCR text versions of archive magazine articles were provided.
