= The Tallis Scholars =

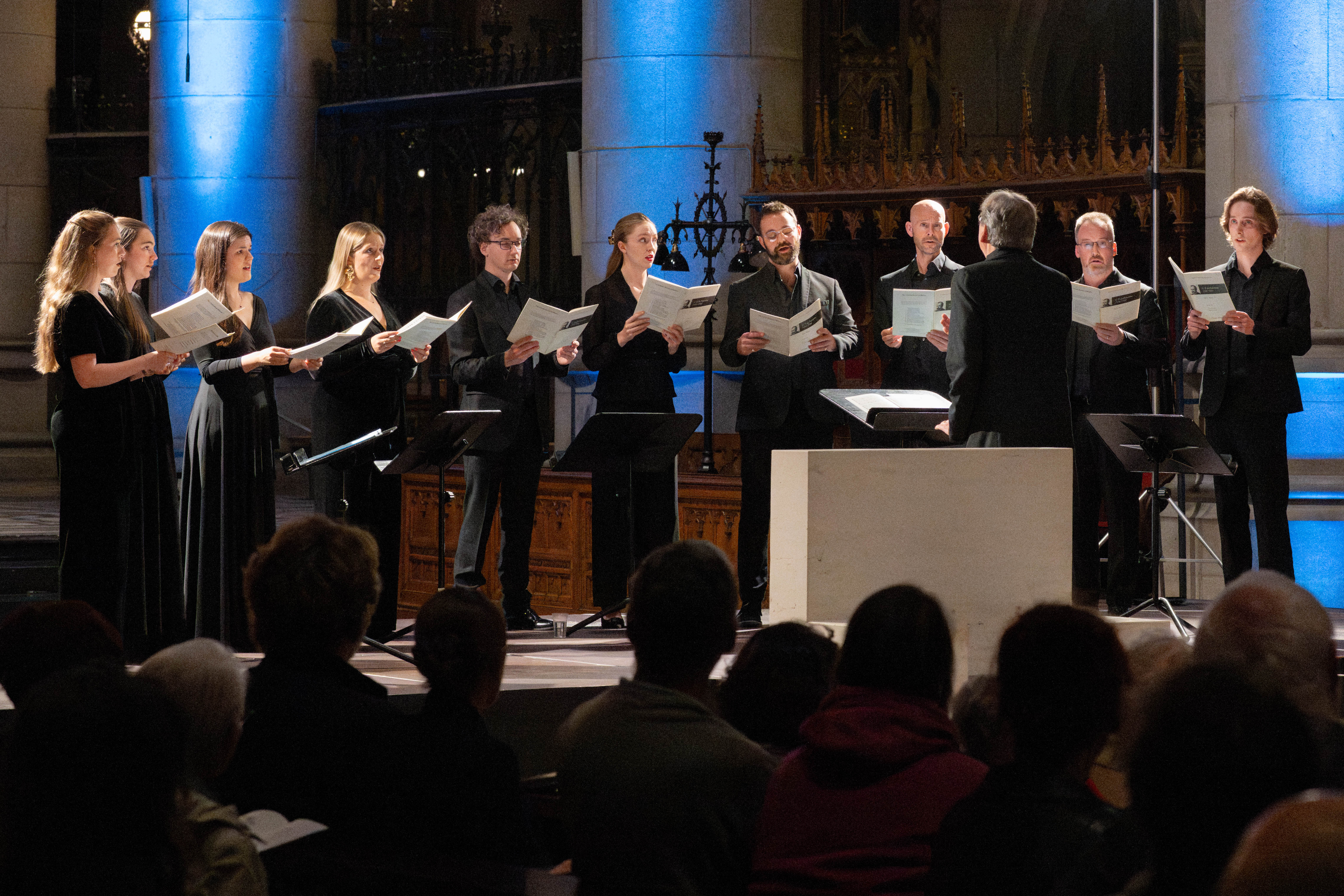
- The Tallis Scholars at the Brucknerfest 2025 in Linz (Austria)

Background information
- Origin: United Kingdom
- Genres: Classical music
- Instrument: Vocal
- Years active: 1973–present
- Labels: Gimell Records
- Website: thetallisscholars.co.uk

The Tallis Scholars are a British professional early music vocal ensemble established in 1973. Usually consisting of two singers per part, with a core group of ten singers, they specialise in performing a cappella sacred vocal music. Peter Phillips, the founder of the group, is their conductor. They have released over 60 discs through their own Gimell Records label. In 2013 they were elected to the Gramophone Hall of Fame. In 2023, Gramophone magazine marked the group's 50th anniversary by dedicating a special edition of its magazine to them.

== History ==
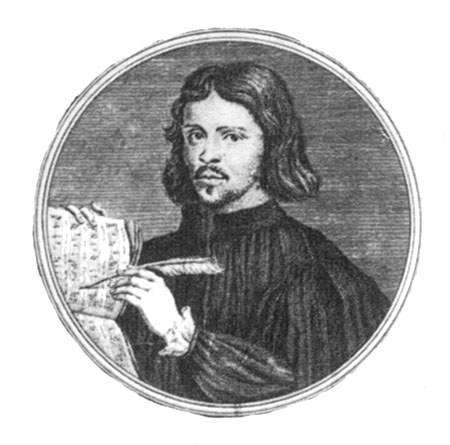
The ensemble is named after the English composer Thomas Tallis

The ensemble was formed in 1973 by Peter Phillips, a music student of David Wulstan and Dennis Arnold, who in 1972–1975 was an organ scholar at St John's College, Oxford. Phillips invited the members of chapel choirs from Oxford and Cambridge to form an amateur Renaissance vocal music ensemble, which turned professional after ten years of concert-giving. From the first performance at the Church of St Mary Magdalen, Oxford, on 3 November 1973, Phillips aimed to produce a distinctive sound influenced by choirs he admired, in particular the Clerkes of Oxenford directed by David Wulstan. Since winning a Gramophone Award in 1987, the Tallis Scholars have been recognised as one of the world's leading ensembles specialising in Renaissance polyphony.

== Concerts ==
The Tallis Scholars tour widely, performing some 70 concerts a year in Europe, North America, Asia and Australia. In April 1994, they sang Allegri's Miserere mei, Deus in the Vatican's newly restored Sistine Chapel. In February 1994 they performed in Rome's Basilica di Santa Maria Maggiore to commemorate the 400th anniversary of the death of the composer Palestrina.

In 1999, the Tallis Scholars toured China, giving two concerts in Beijing. In 1998, they marked their 25th anniversary with a performance at London's National Gallery. In 2000 they performed in New York City with Paul McCartney. For the 2013-2014 40th-anniversary concert series, they announced a world tour to include the United States, Europe, Australia and New Zealand, starting the tour with a concert at St Paul's Cathedral in London for 2,000 people.

== Recordings ==
Since March 1980, the Tallis Scholars have recorded on their own label, Gimell Records, established by Peter Phillips and Steve Smith. The label is named after the compositional technique gymel. In accordance with Phillips,

The word Gimell comes from the Latin word 'gimellus', meaning 'a twin', and it's a technical term. It's a corrupt form of the word gimellus that you find in manuscripts of the Tudor school where the part is twinned. You have to understand that in those days the music wasn't written in score; it was written in parts so you'd only see your part. If you were singing your part and you saw the word 'gimell' it had to be decided in rehearsal that some of you singing that part would have to look elsewhere on the page, or even pick up another book and find your part. So it was a signpost.

Soon, there was a critical consensus that "the Tallis Scholar's recordings are of reliably high quality". From 1981 to 2006 the group recorded 40 critically acclaimed discs. The recordings covered a repertoire from over 150 years of music history (approximately the years 1450–1600), with some excursions into later repertoire. In 2010, Gimell released its 50th recording, de Victoria's Lamentations of Jeremiah. Other notable releases included Gramophone magazine's Record of the Year Award winning disc of Josquin's Missa Pange lingua and Missa La sol fa re mi. In 2011 the ensemble's recording of Allegri's Miserere mei, Deus at Merton College, Oxford, in 1980 was named by BBC Music Magazine as one of the "50 Greatest Recordings of All Time". In 2013 the recording of John Taverner's Missa Gloria tibi Trinitas became number one on the UK Specialist Classical Chart.

== Members ==
According to Phillips, during the 1982-1983 concert season, the Tallis Singers formed a core that was more or less consistent for the next 25 years. Some singers left the group to develop successful solo careers, including Michael Chance, Mark Padmore, James Gilchrist, John Mark Ainsley, Tessa Bonner and Jeremy White, who became a principal bass at The Royal Opera, Covent Garden.

== Accomplishments ==
The Tallis Scholars ensemble contributed to a greater recognition of the choral works of Tallis, Palestrina, Byrd, Tye and de Victoria as well as other European Renaissance sacred and secular composers, while performing over 1,800 concerts around the world and releasing 50 discs. The singers have paved the way for many younger groups such as the Sixteen, the Clerks, the Cardinall's Musick, the Binchois Consort, Trinity Baroque, the Gabrieli Consort and Octarium. Founded in 1999, the Boston-based early music a cappella ensemble Blue Heron is viewed by some critics as an example of the Tallis Scholars' influence on the American early music scene.

In 2000, the group established the Tallis Scholars Summer Schools, a program providing amateur singers and promising young professionals the opportunity to be coached by Phillips and other members of the ensemble in their specialist repertoire. The programme included three courses which took place in Oakham in the United Kingdom, Seattle in the United States and Sydney in Australia.

Various members of the group have scholarly interests in addition to their activities as professional musicians. Phillips has published the scholarly text English Sacred Music 1549–1649. Sally Dunkley, Francis Steele and Deborah Roberts have all worked as music editors and publishers with interests spanning the Renaissance and early Baroque music. Andrew Gant is also organist at the Chapel Royal.

The Tallis Scholars have performed and recorded Russian Orthodox repertoire, including music by Sergei Rachmaninoff and Igor Stravinsky, and contemporary works by Norbert Moret, Ivan Moody, Arvo Pärt, John Tavener, Eric Whitacre, and Nico Muhly.

== Accolades and awards ==
In 2013, The New York Times described the Tallis Scholars as a "superb a cappella ensemble founded and conducted by Peter Phillips". During their 40 years of concert performances, the group has received many accolades and awards.

In 1987, Gramophone magazine awarded the Tallis Scholars its Record of the Year award. In 1989 the French magazine Diapason added its Diapason d'Or de l'Année award. In 1991 and 2004, Gramophone gave the Tallis Scholars its Early Music Award. In 2012 the singers again received the Diapason d'Or de l'Année award, and in 2013 they were elected by a popular vote to Gramophone's hall of fame.

== Discography ==
Year	Composer/s	Title / Works	Detail
1980	Allegri / Palestrina / Mundy	Miserere / Missa Papae Marcelli / Vox patris caelestis	#1 HMV Classical Chart, February 1981
1981	Palestrina	Missa Benedicta es/ Motet	
1982	Tavener, Rachmaninov, Stravinsky, Bortniansky and anon	Russian Orthodox Music	
1982	Gibbons, Byrd, Weelkes, Morley, Tomkins, etc.	English Madrigals	
1983	Palestrina, Lhéritier, Victoria and de Silva	Missa Nigra sum / Motets	
1984	John Taverner	Missa Gloria tibi Trinitas/ Leroy Kyrie/ Dum transisset I	
1984	Tavener	Ikon of Light/ Funeral Ikos/ The Lamb	
1985	Tallis	Spem in alium and other Latin-texted works	
1985	Byrd	The Three Masses	
1986		Christmas Carols and Motets	
1986	Palestrina	Missa Brevis/ Missa Nasce la gioja mia	
1986	Tallis	The Complete English Anthems	
1986	Josquin	Missa Pange Lingua/ Missa La sol fa re mi	Gramophone Magazine Record of the Year, 1987
1987	Gesualdo	Tenebrae responsories for Holy Saturday/ Four Marian Motets	
1987	Clemens	Missa Pastores quidnam vidistis/ Motets	
1987	Victoria / Lobo	Requiem/ Versa Est in Luctum	
1987	Byrd	The Great Service/ Anthems	
1988		Sarum Chant: Missa in Gallicantu	
1988	Cornysh	Stabat Mater, Magnificat, Salve regina and other motets and secular songs	
1989	Sheppard	Media Vita	
1989	Josquin	L'homme armé Masses	Diapason d'Or de l'Année, 1989
1989	Lassus	Missa Osculetur me/ Motets	
1989	Palestrina	Missa Assumpta est Maria/ Missa Sicut lilum	Gramophone magazine Early Music Award, 1991
1990		Music featured on the South Bank Show	1-disc reissue to accompany the programme
1990	Cardoso	Requiem/ Magnificat/ Motets	
1990	Victoria	Tenebrae Responsories	
1991	Isaac	Missa de Apostolis/ Motets	
1991	Tomkins	The Great Service/ Anthems	
1992	Brumel	Missa Et ecce terrae motus (The Earthquake Mass)/ Lamentations/ Magnificat	
1992	Duarte Lobo	Requiem/ Missa Vox clamantis	
1992	Tallis	Lamentations of Jeremiah/ Motets and Antiphons	
1993	Byrd	William Byrd	2-disc reissue to commemorate the 450th anniversary of the composer's birth
1993	Taverner, Tye and Sheppard	The Western Wind Masses	
1994	Palestrina	The Palestrina 400 Collection	4-disc reissue to commemorate the 400th anniversary of the composer's death
1994	de Rore	Missa Praeter rerum seriem/ Motets	Gramophone Early Music Award, 1994; Gramophone/Classic FM People's Choice Award, 1994; Zlatá Harmonie Award, Brno, 1995
1994	Allegri, Palestrina	Live in Rome: Allegri and Palestrina	Winner, Cannes Classical Awards at MIDEM, 1995
1995	Taverner	John Taverner	1-disc reissue to commemorate the 450th anniversary of the composer's death
1995	White	Lamentations/ Magnificat/ Motets	
1996	Obrecht	Missa Maria Zart	
1997		A Tudor Collection	2-disc reissue
1997	Ockeghem	Missa Au travail suis/ Missa De plus en plus and their chansons	
1997	A. Lobo	Missa Maria Magdalene/ Motets	
1997		The Yearning Spirit: Voices of Contemplation	1-disc reissue
1998	Ferrabosco, Tallis, White, Brumel, Palestrina	Lamenta: Lamentations	
1998		Tallis Scholars 25th Anniversary	2-disc reissue
1998	Josquin, Obrecht, Taverner, Byrd, Tallis, Mundy	Tallis Scholars Live in Oxford	
1998	Tallis	Missa Puer natus (The Christmas Mass)/ Magnificat/ Motets	
1999		The Best of the Renaissance	2-disc reissue
2000	Morales	Missa Si bona suscipimus/ Motet	Nominated for a Grammy, 2002
2001	Allegri	Miserere	Reissue of the 1980 release
2001	Tavener	Ikon of Light/ Funeral Ikos/ The Lamb	Reissue of the 1984 release
2001	Gombert	Magnificats 1-4/ chant antiphons	
2002	Gombert	Magnificats 5-8/ chant antiphons	
2002	Tallis	The Complete English Anthems	Reissue of the 1986 release
2002	Tallis	Lamentations of Jeremiah	Reissue of the 1992 release
2003		Christmas with the Tallis Scholars	2-disc reissue
2003		The Essential Tallis Scholars	2-disc reissue
2004	Palestrina	The Tallis Scholars sing Palestrina	2-disc reissue
2004	Tallis	The Tallis Scholars sing Thomas Tallis	2-disc reissue
2005	Allegri	Miserere	25th Anniversary Edition of the 1980 release
2005	Browne	Music from the Eton Choirbook	Gramophone Early Music Award, 2005
2005	Palestrina	Tallis Scholars sing Palestrina	2-disc reissue
2005	Victoria/ D. Lobo/ Cardoso	Requiem	2-disc reissue
2006	Guerrero	Missa Surge Propera/ Motets	
2006	Palestrina	Missa Benedicta es	25th Anniversary Edition of the 1981 release
2006	Byrd	Playing Elizabeth's Tune: Byrd's Mass for Four Voices/ Motets	
2006		Renaissance Giants	2-disc reissue
2006	Josquin	The Tallis Scholars sing Josquin	2-disc reissue
2007	Allegri / Palestrina	Miserere / Missa Papae Marcelli and Motets	New recordings
2007		English Madrigals	25th Anniversary Edition of the 1982 release
2007	Byrd	The Tallis Scholars sing William Byrd	2-disc reissue
2008	Josquin	Missa Sine nomine/ Missa Ad fugam	
2008		The Tallis Scholars sing Tudor Church Music - Volume One	2-disc reissue
2008		The Tallis Scholars sing Tudor Church Music - Volume Two	2-disc reissue
2009		Flemish Masters	2-disc reissue
2009	Josquin	Missa Malheur me bat/ Missa Fortuna desperata	Diapason d'Or, 2010; Nominated for a Grammy, 2009
2010		Sacred Music in the Renaissance, Vol. 1	4-disc reissue to celebrate Gimell's 30th anniversary
2010		Sacred Music in the Renaissance, Vol. 2	4-disc reissue to celebrate Gimell's 30th anniversary
2010		Sacred Music in the Renaissance, Vol. 3	4-disc reissue to celebrate Gimell's 30th anniversary
2010	Victoria	Lamentations of Jeremiah	Nominated for a Grammy, 2010
2011	Josquin	Missa De beata virgine and Missa Ave maris stella	Diapason d'Or de l'Année, 2012
2011		The Victoria Collection	3-disc reissue to commemorate the 400th anniversary of the composer's death
2012	Mouton	Missa Dictes moy toutes voz pensées/ Motets	
2013	Allegri / Palestrina	Miserere / Missa Papae Marcelli	Pure Audio Blu-ray release of the 2007 disc
2013	Whitacre	Sainte-Chapelle	Single track download, not available on CD
2013	Taverner	Missa Gloria tibi Trinitas/ Magnificats	Winner, 51st Japan Record Academy Early Music Award, 2013 #1 for several weeks, UK Specialist Classical Chart, 2013
2013		Renaissance Radio	2-disc reissue of selected tracks
2014	Tavener	Ikon of Light/ Funeral Ikos/ The Lamb	Reissue of the 1984 release to commemorate the death of the composer
2015	Arvo Pärt	Tintinnabuli	MusicWeb International Recording of the Year
2015		Perfect Polyphony	2-disc reissue of selected tracks
2015	John Taverner	Missa Corona spinea/ Dum transisset Sabbatum I and II	
2016	Josquin	Missa Di dadi/ Missa Une mousse de Biscaye	
2016	Josquin	Missa Gaudeamus/ Missa L'ami Baudichon	
2019	Josquin / Bauldeweyn / Brumel	Missa Mater Patris/ Missa Da pacem/ Mater Patris	
2021	Josquin	Missa Hercules Dux Ferrarie - Missa D'ung aultre amer - Missa Faysant regretz	BBC Music Magazine Recording of the Year Award; Gramophone Early Music Award, 2021
2023	Sheppard	Missa Cantate	
2024	Fayrfax	Robert Fayrfax	
2026	Nico Muhly	No Resting Place	
