= His Majestys Sagbutts & Cornetts =

His Majestys Sagbutts & Cornetts (HMSC) is a British early music group founded in 1982. The ensemble presently consists of three cornetts and four sackbuts, with chamber organ or harpsichord. The group frequently collaborates with other instrumentalists and singers, and has an extensive discography on Hyperion Records and other labels.

== History ==
HMSC's first concert was on 3 September 1982 at the church of St Martin-in-the-Fields, Trafalgar Square, London, with guest soloist Richard Wistreich. Meridian Records expressed their interest in recording the group as early as the interval of that first concert.

== Members ==
The original line-up was cornettists Jeremy West, David Staff and sackbut players Sue Addison, Richard Cheetham, Paul Nieman and Stephen Saunders. All but Addison attended the Guildhall School of Music and Drama. Later non-current members include Peter Bassano (sackbuts).

=== Current ensemble ===
Jeremy West, founder member and cornett (1982–);

Stephen Saunders, founder member and bass sackbut (1982–);

Susan Addison, founder member and Alto and Tenor Sackbut

Jamie Savan, cornett (2005–);

Helen Roberts, cornett (2012–);

Stephanie Dyer, alto & tenor sackbuts (2016–).

=== Founder members (est. 1982) ===
==== Cornetts ====
Jeremy West, David Staff

==== Sackbuts ====
Sue Addison, Richard Cheetham, Paul Nieman, Stephen Saunders

==== Keyboard ====
Alistair Ross

== Selected discography ==
- His Majesties Sagbutts and Cornetts - by His Majesties Sagbutts and Cornetts Meridian
- Giovanni Battista Grillo - complete instrumental music & selected motets by His Majestys Sagbutts & Cornetts
- The Twelve Days of Christmas by His Majestys Sagbutts & Cornetts
- Buccaneer - Music from England and Spain by His Majestys Sagbutts & Cornetts
- Grand Tour - Music From 16th And 17th Century Italy, Spain And Germany by His Majestys Sagbutts & Cornetts Hyperion
- Giovanni Gabrieli: The 16 Canzonas and Sonatas from Sacrae Symphoniae, 1597 His Majestys Sagbutts and Cornetts, Timothy Roberts
- Andrea Gabrieli: Missa Pater peccavi; Motets and Instrumental Music Timothy Roberts
- Giovanni Gabrieli: Canzoni Per Sonare, Venice, 1608 by His Majestys Sagbutts & Cornetts
- 1615 Gabrieli in Venice by Choir of King's College, Cambridge, Stephen Cleobury
- A Bach Album by His Majestys Consort of Voices and His Majestys Sagbutts & Cornetts
- Guerrero: Missa de la batalla escoutez by Westminster Cathedral Choir and His Majestys Sagbutts & Cornetts
- For These Distracted Tymes - Music from the Civil Wars His Majestys Sagbutts and Cornetts, London Baroque Meridian
- Music from 17th Century Germany Richard Wistreich His Majestys Sagbutts and Cornetts, Meridian
- Venice Preserved - Gentlemen of the Chappell, His Majesties Sagbutts and Cornetts, Peter Bassano ASV Gaudeamus
- Castello and Picchi: The Floating City - Sonatas, canzonas and dances by two of Monteverdi’s contemporaries His Majestys Sagbutts & Cornetts Hyperion
- For His Majestys Sagbutts and Cornetts - English music from Henry VIII to Charles II His Majestys Sagbutts & Cornetts Hyperion Records
- Lassus: Missa Vinum Bonum Ex Cathedra & His Majesty's Sagbutts & Cornetts, Jeffrey Skidmore ASV
- Giovanni Gabrieli Ex Cathedra & His Majesty's Sagbutts & Cornetts, Jeffrey Skidmore Hyperion
- Monteverdi: Vespro della beata Vergine (1610) Monteverdi Choir, English Baroque Soloists, His Majesties Sagbutts and Cornetts, John Eliot Gardiner Archiv
- Monteverdi L'Orfeo Monteverdi Choir, English Baroque Soloists, His Majesties Sagbutts and Cornetts, John Eliot Gardiner Archiv
- Schutz Musikalische Exequien Monteverdi Choir, English Baroque Soloists, His Majesties Sagbutts and Cornetts, John Eliot Gardiner Archiv
- Philippe Rogier: Music from the Missae Sex His Majestys Sagbutts and Cornetts & Magnificat, Philip Cave Linn Records
- Philippe Rogier: Polychoral Works His Majestys Sagbutts and Cornetts & Magnificat, Philip Cave
- Guerrero - Missa Super flumina Babylonis Ensemble Plus Ultra, Schola Antiqua & His Majestys Sagbutts and Cornetts, Michael Noone Glossa
- Gioseffo Guami 'La Luchesina' His Majesty's Sagbutts & Cornetts SFZ Music
- Capriccio Stravagante, Vol.1 by The Purcell Quartet Chandos
- Capriccio Stravagante, Vol.2 by The Purcell Quartet Chandos
- Laudent Deum: Sacred Music by Orlande de Lassus by Andrew Nethsingha Chandos
- Lassus: Missa Bell' Amfitrit' altera by Westminster Cathedral Choir and His Majestys Sagbutts & Cornetts Hyperion
