= Noel Bauldeweyn =

Franco-Flemish composer (c. 1480 – after 1513)

Noel Bauldeweyn (first name also Noe, Natalis; surname also Balbun, Balduin, Bauldewijn, Baulduin, Baulduvin, and Valdovin; (c. 1480 – after 1513) was a Franco-Flemish composer of the Renaissance, active in the Low Countries. A contemporary of Josquin des Prez, he had a strong reputation until well after the middle of the 16th century. That some of his works have long been misattributed to Josquin, the most renowned composer of the age, is indicative of his skill as a composer.

== Life ==
Little documentation of his life has yet come to light. He is known to have been the singing master at St. Rombouts in Mechelen between 1509 and 1513, replacing Jean Richafort. That he held a position of such high status, in a church which was a musical center – and also used by the Burgundian court chapel itself – indicates that he was probably not younger than about 25 at the time. In 1513, Jacques Champion took Bauldeweyn's position at St. Rombouts, but the circumstances of his departure, and where he went, are not known.

The extraordinarily wide distribution of his music in sources, ranging from Italy, Bohemia, the Netherlands, and Spain, suggests that he may have traveled, though at what point in his career he did so is unknown; and the evident stylistic evolution from an early to a late idiom suggests he may have been active as a composer for decades. Aside from the few shreds of documented biography at St. Rombouts, and the inferences about his career from his music itself, no definite information about his life is known.

== Music and influence ==
Bauldeweyn wrote both sacred and secular music, all of it for voices. In addition to 13 motets, there are seven surviving masses in addition to at least one lost work, as indicated by a fantasia for vihuela by Valderrábano, "after a mass by Bauldeweyn", the music of which is not known from any source. The most famous of these is the Missa Da pacem included in the Smijers complete works edition of Josquin (1953). Edgar Sparks (1972) pointed out that its earliest manuscript source (1516–18) named Bauldeweyn as the composer, and that only later sources including a 1539 print named Josquin as the composer.

Bauldeweyn's style shows both the contrapuntal manner of the late 15th century, archaic by the time he was writing, with occasional harsh dissonance and unblended textures, as well as the pervasive imitation and canonic writing techniques of the generation of Josquin des Prez and his successors. The style of some of his latest works implies that he may have lived a good deal longer than indicated by the last mention of his name at St Rombouts in 1513. Bauldeweyn preferred textures of five or six voices, characteristic of the 1520s and the next decades. He liked full textures, and had a sense of harmony which anticipated changes later in the century.

== Recordings ==
- Missa En Douleur tristesse; Missa Inviolata integra et casta es; Missa Myn Liefkens bruyn oghen; Missa Sine Nomine. Beauty Farm 2CD Fra Bernardo, DDD, 2017
- Missa Du bon du cueur: Music by Bauldeweyn, Mouton, Willaert and others. Capella Alamire, P. Urquhart, dir. Centaur CRC 3637 (2018)
- Missa Da Pacem Domine. The Tallis Scholars conductor Peter Philips CD Gimell, DDD, 2019
