= Missa La sol fa re mi =

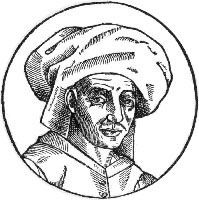
Woodcut of Josquin des Prez; the turban he is wearing is indicative of a fashion in 1490s Italy, possibly related to the circumstances of composition of the Missa La sol fa re mi.

The Missa La sol fa re mi is a musical setting of the mass by Josquin des Prez, first published in 1502. It is one of his most famous masses, and one of the earliest and most renowned examples of the soggetto cavato technique – the technique of deriving musical notes from the syllables of a phrase, in this case "Lascia fare mi" (Italian: "let me do it").

== Background ==
"Lascia fare mi" ("leave it to me", or possibly in a more idiomatic translation, "let me do it") was supposedly a common phrase used by an unknown aristocrat to get people to stop pestering him with requests or complaints. The story was first reported by Glareanus, writing in 1547, who went on to say, "and then [Josquin] went on to write an entire mass, an exceedingly elegant work, based on these same words: thus, 'La sol fa re mi.'" The musical syllables La–Sol–Fa–Re–Mi correspond to A–G–F–D–E in the "natural" hexachord, the six notes starting on C.

There have been several attempts to date the mass, and opinions of Josquin scholars differ, placing it variously between the late 1470s and the 1490s. Ottaviano Petrucci published it in his first book of masses in 1502, one of the first books of music ever to be printed, which shows its importance and influence; indeed it was widely transmitted, in many other sources, in the early 16th century. The mass may have been written during Josquin's Roman period, for example between 1490 and 1493, while Josquin was singing in the Sistine Chapel choir. Its contrapuntal sophistication, as well as circumstantial evidence suggesting who the aristocrat may have been, perhaps indicate the later date. If the earlier date is correct, it would be the earliest mass ever written on solmization syllables; as it is, it is one of the earliest masses on a freely invented subject.

If the mass is dated to the 1490s, circumstantial evidence suggests that the aristocrat who made excessive promises may not have been an Italian at all, but a Turk. Prince Cem Sultan, half-brother of Bayezid II, was being kept captive (in opulent luxury) in Rome during the period Josquin was there, and relentlessly implored Pope Innocent VIII (and later Alexander VI) for help in overthrowing his half-brother; the Pope in turn threatened Sultan Bayezid that he would release Cem if Bayezid ever renewed war against Christian Europe. Cem apparently made endless impossible promises and was singularly irritating; this in addition to the vogue in Italy in the 1490s for Turkish fashion (as seen in the turban Josquin wears in his woodcut portrait) has suggested that Josquin may have been poking fun at Cem with the mass – who also steadfastly refused to convert to Christianity.

== The music ==
As is the case with most mass settings in the middle Renaissance, it consists of the following parts:

1. Kyrie
2. Gloria
3. Credo
4. Sanctus and Benedictus
5. Agnus Dei I, II and III

It is mainly in Phrygian mode, although with numerous shifts to Aeolian and Dorian. The La–sol–fa–re–mi figure saturates the texture, appearing more than 200 times within the course of the mass. Most of the time it is in the tenor, suggesting that it may have been originally drafted as a cantus-firmus mass early in Josquin's career, and later reworked as a paraphrase mass with the ostinato appearing in all voices in different permutations.

Not only does the five-note figure appear throughout, but it appears in compositional permutations such as retrograde (Mi–Re–Fa–Sol–La), occasionally making palindromic figures as a result of retrogrades appearing immediately before or after statements of the figure in its original form. In addition, Josquin uses the figure in each of the three hexachords available to Renaissance music theory: the natural hexachord beginning on C (giving A–G–F–D–E for the figure), the "hard" hexachord beginning on G (giving E–D–C–A–B♮ for the figure), and the "soft" hexachord beginning on F (giving D–C–B♭–G–A for the figure). Sometimes he swaps hexachords in mid-figure, a compositional trick visible on the page but difficult to hear. The motivic saturation characteristic to the piece, including use of permutations such as retrograde, is more commonly associated with music of the Second Viennese School than the Renaissance, but Josquin was not only an innovator: he was working with a motivic cell which was singularly well-suited to such treatment.

The Missa La sol fa re mi remains one of Josquin's most famous masses, and is often performed and recorded.

== References and further reading ==
- Bonnie J. Blackburn, "Masses on Popular Songs and on Syllables", in Richard Sherr, ed., The Josquin Companion. Oxford, Oxford Univ. Press, 2000. ISBN 0-19-816335-5
- Gustave Reese, Music in the Renaissance. New York, W.W. Norton & Co., 1954. ISBN 0-393-09530-4
- Gustave Reese (biography) and Jeremy Noble (works), "Josquin Desprez," Howard Mayer Brown, "Mass", in The New Grove Dictionary of Music and Musicians, ed. Stanley Sadie. 20 vol. London, Macmillan Publishers Ltd., 1980. ISBN 1-56159-174-2
- Patrick Macey: "Josquin des Prez", Grove Music Online, ed. L. Macy (Accessed December 16, 2006), (subscription access)
- Dawson Kiang, "Josquin Desprez and a Possible Portrait of the Ottoman Prince Jem in Cappella Sistina Ms. 41", Bibliothèque d'Humanisme et Renaissance, 54. 1992.
