= Peter Phillips (conductor) =

British choral conductor and musicologist

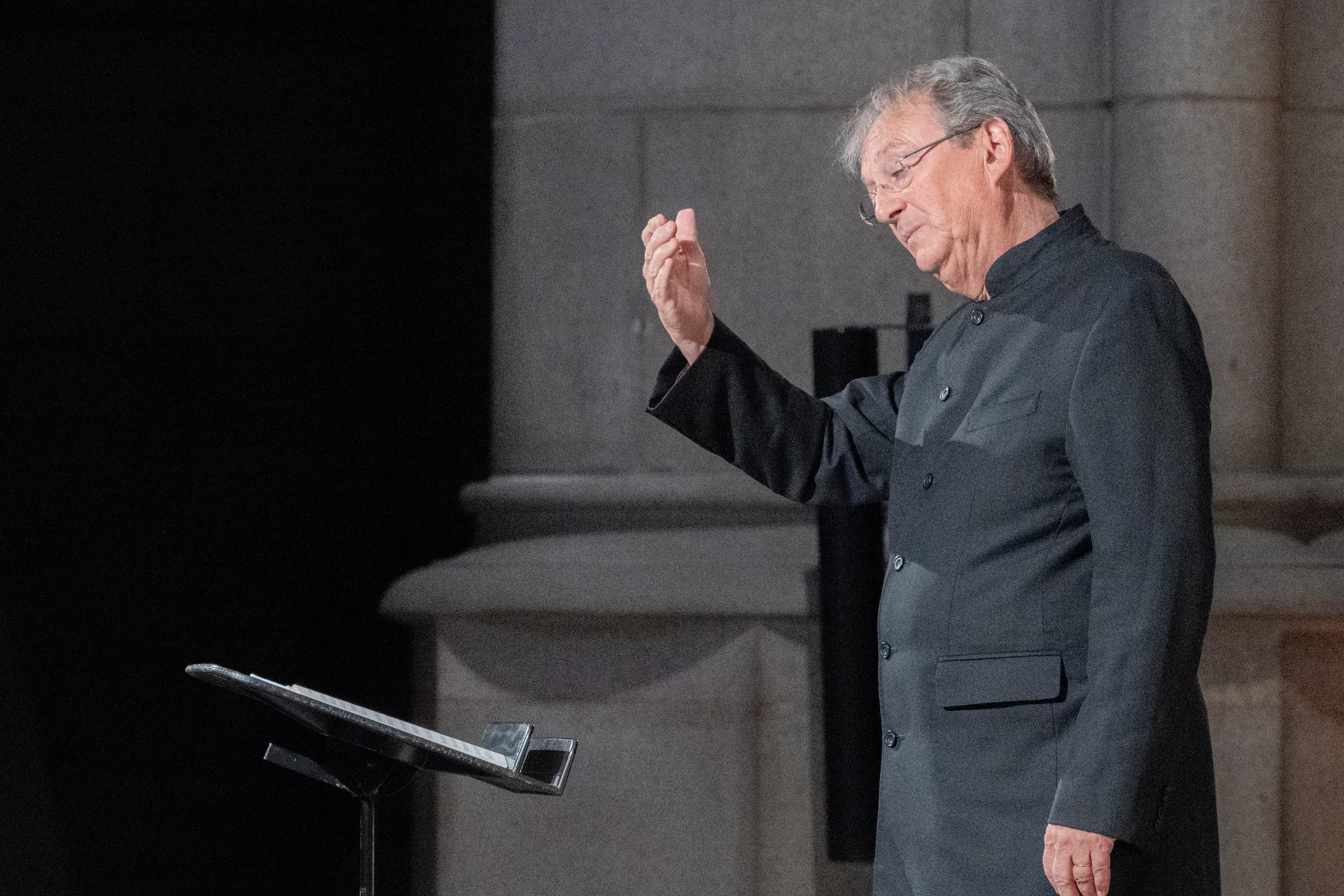
- Phillips in 2025
- Born: 15 October 1953 (age 73); Southampton, Hampshire, England
- Education: St John's College, Oxford
- Occupations: Choral conductor, musicologist
- Spouses: Clio Lloyd-Jacob (1987–1993); Caroline Trevor (1997–present)
- Children: 3
- Website: Tallis Scholars; Gimell Records

Peter Phillips (born 15 October 1953) is a British choral conductor, musicologist and writer. He is the founder of The Tallis Scholars as well as Gimell Records. He has been the owner of the Musical Times since 1995.

== Early life and education ==
Phillips was born to Nigel Sayer Phillips and Patricia Ann Witchell, (née Wyatt) in Southampton. He was educated at Winchester College (1967–71) and St John's College, Oxford (Organ Scholar 1972–75). He studied music with Hugh Macdonald, Denis Arnold and David Wulstan. He subsequently taught at Oxford University, Trinity College of Music and the Royal College of Music in London (where he directed the Chamber Choir in succession to David Willcocks), but had resigned all these posts by 1988 in order to pursue a full-time career in conducting.

== The Tallis Scholars ==
Phillips's first concert with the Tallis Scholars took place in St Mary Magdalen's Church in Oxford on 3 November 1973. The group was made up of choral scholars (hence the use of the word 'Scholars' in the title) and layclerks from the leading Oxbridge choral foundations. From the beginning, Phillips aimed to produce a distinctive sound, influenced by choirs he admired, in particular the Clerkes of Oxenford. However the repertoire he chose was idiosyncratic, based in his desire to explore neglected corners of the polyphonic repertories, continental as much as English. This first concert included music by Obrecht, Ockeghem, Lassus and Victoria. After the founding of Gimell Records in 1980, the Tallis Scholars have gone on to fill many gaps in the recording catalogue, making discs devoted to such relatively unknown composers as Cardoso, White, Clemens, Gombert, Mouton, Browne and Fayrfax.

Since winning the Gramophone Record of the Year Award in 1987, the Tallis Scholars have been recognised as one of the world's leading ensemble in interpreting renaissance polyphony. That 1987 disc inaugurated a career-long project of recording all of Josquin des Prez’s masses, ready for the 500th anniversary of the composer’s death, in 2021. The ninth and last disc in the series also won an Award entitled Record of the Year – from the BBC Music Magazine – in 2021, 34 years after the first one.

In 2013 he directed the Tallis Scholars in a 99-concert year of events, to celebrate the 40th anniversary of the group. Amongst other countries they visited New Zealand for the first time, Australia for the seventh time, Japan for the 14th time, and the US for the 61st. As of 2021, The Tallis Scholars have given more than two-thirds of their 2,500 concerts outside the UK. In November 2023 they celebrated their 50th anniversary with a special concert in the Middle Temple Hall in London

=== Relationship with John Tavener ===
Phillips first met the composer John Tavener in 1977, which led to a lifelong friendship. For many years Tavener was the only living composer to write for The Tallis Scholars, a connection which resulted in pieces such as the Ikon of Light (1984), Let not the Prince be silent (1988), the Lord's Prayer (1999), Tribute to Cavafy (1999) and The Requiem Fragments (2014), which was dedicated to Phillips.

=== Relationship with other composers ===
In more recent years Phillips has commissioned Eric Whitacre, Gabriel Jackson, Nico Muhly, Ivan Moody, John Woolrich, Matthew Martin, Christopher Willcock, Michael Nyman, David Lang and in 2014 made a disc entirely dedicated to Arvo Pärt's tintinnabuli style.

=== Appearing at the Proms ===
Phillips gave his first Promenade concert in 1988, since when he has appeared eight more times, always with the Tallis Scholars, though in 2007 also with the BBC Singers, when the two groups joined forces to give the first modern performance of Striggio's 60-part Mass Ecco si beato giorno. Phillips and The Tallis Scholars appeared at the Proms on 4 August 2014 to help mark the anniversary of the outbreak of World War I, with a Requiem written for them by John Tavener, televised on BBC 4. In 2018 they returned to the Albert Hall to sing a specially adapted Compline service.

== Other conducting work ==
In 1985 Phillips was invited by Philippe Herreweghe to conduct La Chapelle Royale of Paris and the Netherlands Chamber Choir, which sparked a lifelong interest in working with groups trained outside the Anglican choral tradition. These invitations also promoted in Phillips an interest in European culture, cuisines and languages. He has owned property in Paris since 1989 and given interviews in French, German, Italian and Spanish. He is also a student of Arabic (in which he has not given an interview).

Phillips started a collaboration with the BBC Singers in 2003, with whom he has now appeared in nearly 25 productions, most recently in May 2023. In 2021 he conducted them in a live broadcast from Maida Vale, featuring Mexican polyphony written for Puebla Cathedral. He has recorded with the Spanish group El León de Oro (Oviedo). Other groups he has worked with include Intrada (Moscow), Estonian Philharmonic Chamber Choir and the Danish Radio Choir.

In 2018 he gave a six-part series of lectures on BBC Radio 3, entitled The Glories of Polyphony.

== Educational work ==
In 2000 Peter Phillips and David Woodcock set up the first Tallis Scholars Summer School in Oakham. This was followed in 2005 by an extension in Seattle (US), and in 2007 by one in Sydney, Australia. He has also been involved with similar courses in Rimini, Evora and Barcelona. He lectured on the John Hall pre-University course in Venice from 1981 to 2019.

Phillips began an association with Merton College Chapel in 1974 when, as an undergraduate, he directed Tallis's 'Why fum'th in fight' as a prelude to a performance of Vaughan Williams's Fantasia on a Theme of Thomas Tallis. The Tallis Scholars recorded regularly in Merton Chapel between 1976 and 1987, returning more permanently in 2005. In 2006, with the help of Jessica Rawson and Simon Jones, Phillips established a new choral foundation at the College. This choir sang its first services under Phillips and Benjamin Nicholas in October 2008.

In 2014 Phillips helped to establish the first of three London International Choral Competitions at St John's Smith Square. Among the judges were John Rutter, Emma Kirkby, Alastair Hume, Mark Williams and James O'Donnell. Featured composers have been John Tavener, Gabriel Jackson and Arvo Pärt.

Phillips became a founding trustee of the Muze Trust, a charity designed to help with musical education in Zambia. At the invitation of Paul Kelly he visited Lusaka in 2010, directing Vox Zambesi in a concert and a recording, and continuing as a Trustee until 2023.

== Publications ==
Phillips wrote a regular column for The Spectator on all aspects of classical music from January 1983 to May 2016.

In 1995 he became the owner and publisher of the Musical Times – the oldest continuously published music journal in the world. Phillips has also written for the Times Literary Supplement, Early Music Magazine, The Times, The Guardian, the Musical Times, the Royal Academy Magazine, the London Review of Books, the BBC Music Magazine and the Evening Standard. He featured in Bernard D Sherman's 2003 book Inside Early Music: Conversations with Performers.

He has written three books:

- English Sacred Music 1549–1649 (Gimell, 1991, ISBN 978-0-9515784-0-7)
- What We Really Do: The Tallis Scholars (Musical Times, 2nd edition, 2013 ISBN 978-0-9545777-2-8)
- The Blue French (Musical Times, 1st edition, 2023 ISBN 978-0-9545777-3-5) Phillips' first novel. It is an account of a performance of Tallis's Spem in alium which focuses on the daily lives of London-based singers

== Awards and honours ==
In 1990 Phillips was the subject of The South Bank Show, introduced by Melvyn Bragg. It followed the course of renaissance polyphony through England and the Netherlands and was entitled "A Personal Odyssey".

In 2005, Phillips was made a Chevalier de l’Ordre des Arts et des Lettres by the French Minister of Culture, a decoration intended to honour individuals who have contributed to the understanding of French culture in the world, in his case Josquin des Prez.

From 2008 to 2016 he was made a Reed Rubin Director of Music at Merton College, Oxford, and in 2010 a Bodley Fellow. In 2021 he was elected an Honorary Fellow of St John’s College, Oxford, where he had been Organ Scholar from 1972 to 1975.

With the Tallis Scholars he has received:

- Gramophone Awards in 1987, 1991, 1994, 2005 and 2021
- Diapason d'Or de l’Année in 1989 and 2012
- Grammy nominations in 1997, 2001, 2009 and 2010
- Record of the Year from the BBC Music Magazine in 2021

His 1980 recording of Allegri's Miserere was said by the BBC Music Magazine to be one of the 50 greatest recordings of all time.

In 2009 the Tallis Scholars were voted by Early Music Today the fourth most influential early group in the history of the genre, after the instrumental ensembles of David Munrow, John Eliot Gardiner and Christopher Hogwood. In 2013 they were voted into the Gramophone Hall of Fame – about 120 names from the entire history of classical recording – the only early music group to be so listed.
