= Jean l'Héritier =

French composer

Jean L'Héritier (Lhéritier, Lirithier, Heritier and other spellings also exist) (c. 1480 – after 1551) was a French composer of the Renaissance. He was mainly famous as a composer of motets, and is representative of the generation of composers active in the early to middle 16th century who anticipated the style of Palestrina.

== Life ==
Jean l'Héritier was a native of the diocese of Thérouanne, in the Pas-de-Calais, but little is known about his early years. According to a note by an Italian contemporary, L'Héritier was a pupil of Josquin des Prez, a relationship which most likely occurred while Josquin was at the French royal court in the years after 1500 (exact years for Josquin's stay there have not been established). In 1506 he went to Ferrara, his first trip to Italy. This was shortly after the death of the renowned Obrecht, who died in Ferrara's plague of 1505. Antoine Brumel, another older and more established French composer, went to Ferrara in late 1505 to take Obrecht's place as choirmaster to Alfonso I d'Este, and it is possible that the young L'Héritier was known to Brumel and was recommended to the Este family by him.

All the remaining records of L'Héritier's life come from Italy, so he may have stayed there. After a stay in Ferrara, Duke Alfonso gave him leave to go back to France, but it is not known if he went; the next record of his life is from Rome, where he was in the employ of Pope Leo X in 1514. In 1521 and 1522 he was maestro di cappella at San Luigi dei Francesi, the French church in Rome. Since much of his music appears in Roman manuscripts of this time, he was probably very active as a composer during these years. In 1522 he left Rome and probably went to Mantua, where he was recorded as a singer in the chapel of the Gonzaga family in May 1525. In July 1525 L'Héritier went to Verona, where he worked in some capacity for the Bishop of Verona. During this time he was acquired the patronage of the Cardinal of Auch, François de Clermont, who awarded him at least five benefices, and seems to have retained a connection to him until Clermont's death in 1541.

The remainder of L'Héritier's life is obscure. He maintained ties with Ferrara, as evidenced by his publications there, and he may have been in Venice or Venetian territories later, since Pietro Gaetano, a singer at Saint Mark's, claimed to have studied with him, and additionally a book of L'Héritier's motets was published in Venice in 1555. A note written by the papal legate in Avignon indicated that L'Héritier was still alive in 1552.

== Works and influence ==
L'Héritier mainly wrote motets, of which there are records of 48, not all of which survive. Some of them have been attributed to other composers, including Adrian Willaert, Jean Mouton, and Philippe Verdelot. Stylistically they are transitional between the styles of Josquin and Palestrina. The later works contain more evenly spaced imitation, and more equality of voices, and more smoothness of counterpoint than the earlier works. Often L'Héritier varied polyphonic with homophonic passages, a technique for achieving variety which was common among many Franco-Flemish composers of the time.

Most of the motets are based on standard liturgical material: psalms, devotional hymns, responsories, and so forth. Most are in a single section, with the remainder being in two parts. Occasionally L'Héritier wrote for many independent parts: for example, Locutus est Dominus is for nine voices (four to six was the norm). Another motet, Nigra sum (One of three settings of this text), was familiar to Palestrina, who used it as source material for his Missa nigra sum of 1590.

Only two secular songs by L'Héritier have survived, including one based on an extremely erotic secular poem (Cum rides mihi basium negasti).

A four-part setting of the Mass Ordinary also survives.

L'Héritier was one of the leading figures in disseminating the Franco-Flemish style in Italy in the early 16th century, along with Willaert. Since L'Héritier was mainly a composer of sacred music, and worked in Rome, leaving numerous compositions in the Vatican archive, he may have been one of the most influential northern musicians on the development of the later Palestrina style. In addition, since his work appears in numerous manuscripts of the 16th century—at least 66, as well as 45 printed collections—and in areas as far apart as Spain, Austria, Bohemia, and Poland, in addition to France and Italy—his influence seems to have been considerable.

== Other L'Héritiers ==
There were two other French musicians of the 16th century named L'Héritier: Antoine (fl. 1508–1532) and Isaac (fl. around 1540). The former was also from the Pas-de-Calais and may be related to Jean; he was a singer at the Sainte-Chapelle from 1508, and was in the service of Charles V between 1520 and 1532. No details are known about Isaac's life, nor is it known whether or not the L'Héritiers were part of the same family, but Isaac is known to be the composer of at least three chansons which were published by music printer Jacques Moderne in Lyon in 1541.
