= England =

Country within the United Kingdom

- Flag
- Anthem: None officially; Predominantly "God Save the King" (Note: England has no official anthem, as such it typically uses the anthem of the United Kingdom at international events, although it sometimes makes use of other English patriotic songs such as Land of Hope and Glory and the hymn Jerusalem.)
- Location of England (dark green) – in Europe (green & dark grey) – in the United Kingdom (green)
- Status: Country
- Capital and largest city: London; 51°30′26″N 0°07′39″W
- National language: English, BSL
- Regional languages: Cornish
- Ethnic groups (2021): 81.0% White; 9.6% Asian; 4.2% Black; 3.0% Mixed; 2.2% other
- Religion (2021): 46.3% Christianity; 36.7% no religion; 6.7% Islam; 1.8% Hinduism; 0.9% Sikhism; 0.5% Judaism; 0.5% Buddhism; 0.6% other; 6.0% not stated
- Demonym: English (Note: Englishman/Englishwoman)
- Sovereign state; Legal jurisdiction: United Kingdom; England and Wales
- Government: Direct rule by the UK Government (Note: England has Devolution in England under the legal category of Strategic Authority containing Combined Authorities & County Combined Authorities and the Greater London Authority. This system of devolution is sui generis within the UK, and the process is still ongoing with further work required to complete it in England.) within a parliamentary constitutional monarchy
  - Monarch: Charles III

Parliament of the United Kingdom
  - House of Commons: 543 MPs (of 650)

Establishment
  - Unification of Angles, Saxons and Danes: By 12 July 927
  - Union with Scotland: 1 May 1707

Area
  - Total (Note: ONS Standard Area Measurement, 'total extent of the realm' (area to mean low water)): 132,932 km^{2} (51,325 sq mi)
  - Land (Note: ONS Standard Area Measurement, 'area to mean high water excluding inland water'): 130,310 km^{2} (50,310 sq mi)

Population
  - 2025 estimate: 58,834,812
  - 2021 census: 56,490,048
  - Density: 451/km^{2} (1,168.1/sq mi)
- GVA: 2023 estimate
  - Total: £2.113 trillion
  - Per capita: £36,632
- GDP (nominal): 2023 estimate
  - Total: £2.330 trillion
  - Per capita: £40,382
- Currency: Sterling (Note: Commonly also known as the "pound" (the name of its base unit) or "pound sterling".) (GBP; £)
- Time zone: UTC+0 (GMT)
  - Summer (DST): UTC+1 (BST)
- Date format: dd/mm/yyyy (AD)
- Calling code: +44
- ISO 3166 code: GB-ENG

England is a country that is part of the United Kingdom. It is located on the island of Great Britain, of which it covers about 62%, and more than 100 smaller adjacent islands. England shares a land border with Scotland to the north and another land border with Wales to the west, and is surrounded by the North Sea to the east, the English Channel to the south, the Celtic Sea to the south-west, and the Irish Sea to the west. Continental Europe lies to the south-east, and Ireland to the west. The population was 56,490,048 according to the 2021 census, with nine million inhabitants in its largest city, London.

The area now called England was first inhabited by modern humans during the Upper Paleolithic. It takes its name from the Angles, a Germanic tribe who settled during the 5th and 6th centuries. England became a unified state in the 10th century and has had extensive cultural and legal impact on the wider world since the Age of Discovery, which began during the 15th century. The Kingdom of England, which included Wales after 1535, ceased to be a separate sovereign state on 1 May 1707, when the Acts of Union brought into effect a political union with the Kingdom of Scotland, forming the Kingdom of Great Britain.

England is the origin of the English language, the English legal system (which served as the basis for the common law systems of many other countries), association football, and the Anglican branch of Christianity; its parliamentary system of government has been widely adopted by other nations. The Industrial Revolution began in 18th-century England, transforming its society into the world's first industrialised nation. England is home to the two oldest universities in the English-speaking world: the University of Oxford, founded in 1096, and the University of Cambridge, founded in 1209.

England's terrain chiefly consists of low hills and plains, especially in the centre and south. Upland and mountainous terrain is mostly found in the north and west, including Dartmoor, the Lake District, the Pennines, and the Shropshire Hills. The London metropolitan area has a population of over 15 million as of 2025, representing the United Kingdom's largest metropolitan area. England's population of 56.3 million comprises 84% of the population of the United Kingdom, largely concentrated around London, the South East, and conurbations in the Midlands, the North West, the North East, and Yorkshire, which each developed as major industrial regions during the 19th century.

== Toponymy ==
The name "England" is derived from the Old English name Englaland, which means "land of the Angles". The Angles were one of the Germanic tribes that settled in Great Britain during the Early Middle Ages. They came from the Angeln region of what is now the German state of Schleswig-Holstein. The earliest recorded use of the term, as "Engla londe", is in the late-ninth-century translation into Old English of Bede's Ecclesiastical History of the English People. The term was then used to mean "the land inhabited by the English", and it included English people in what is now south-east Scotland but was then part of the English kingdom of Northumbria. The Anglo-Saxon Chronicle recorded that the Domesday Book of 1086 covered the whole of England, meaning the English kingdom, but a few years later the Chronicle stated that King Malcolm III went "out of Scotlande into Lothian in Englaland", thus using it in the more ancient sense.

The earliest attested reference to the Angles occurs in the 1st-century work by Tacitus, Germania, in which the Latin word Anglii is used. The etymology of the tribal name itself is disputed by scholars; it has been suggested that it derives from the shape of the Angeln peninsula, an angular shape. How and why a term derived from the name of this tribe, rather than others such as the Saxons, came to be used for the entire country is not known, but it seems this is related to the custom of calling the Germanic people in Britain Angli Saxones or English Saxons to distinguish them from continental Saxons (Eald-Seaxe) of Old Saxony in Germany. In Scottish Gaelic, the Saxon tribe gave their name to the word for England (Sasunn); similarly, the Welsh name for the English language is Saesneg. A romantic name for England is Loegria, related to the Welsh word for England, Lloegr, and made popular by its use in Arthurian legend. Albion is also applied to England in a more poetic capacity, though its original meaning is the island of Britain as a whole.

== History ==
=== Prehistory ===
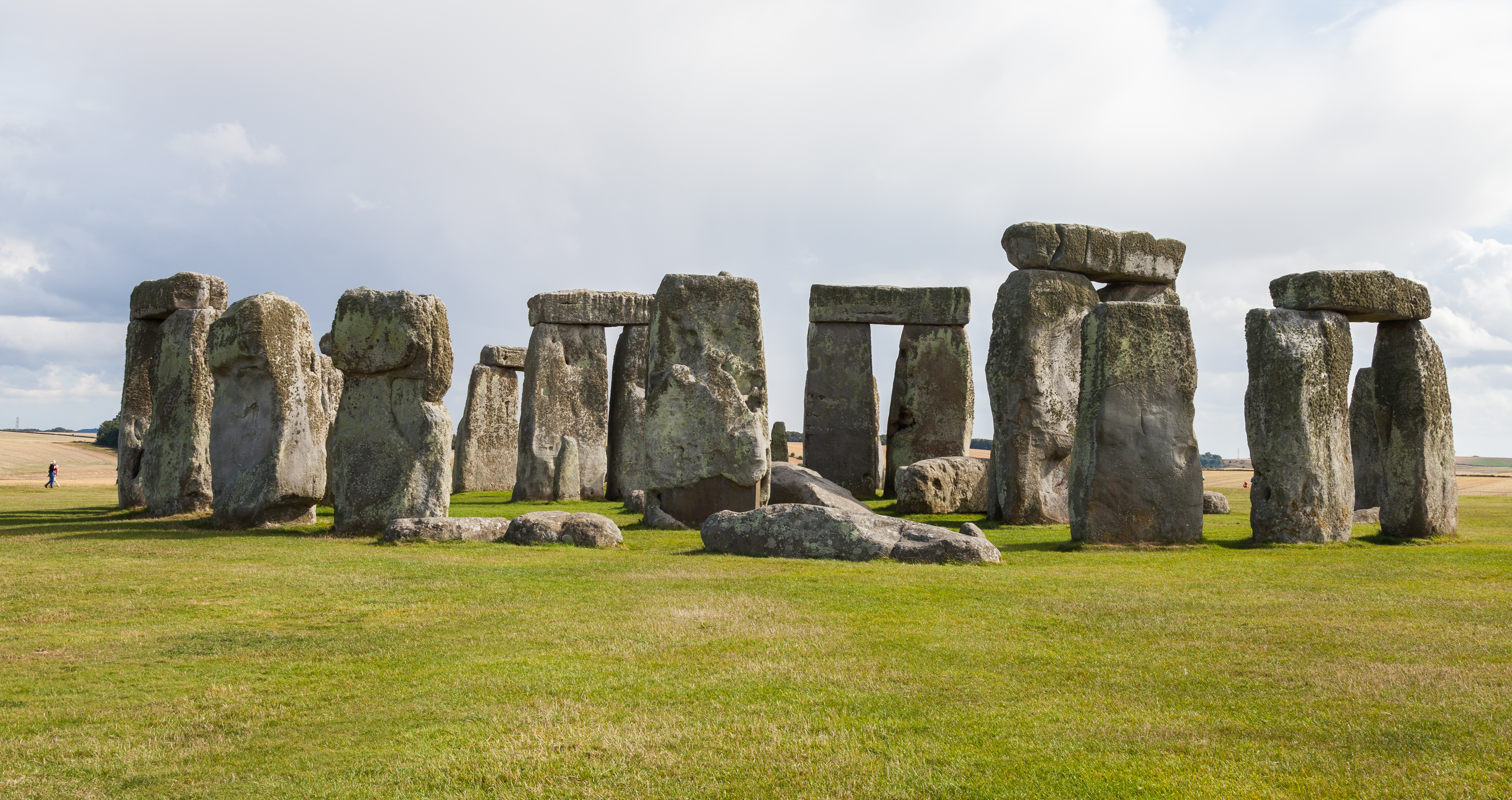
Stonehenge, a Neolithic monument

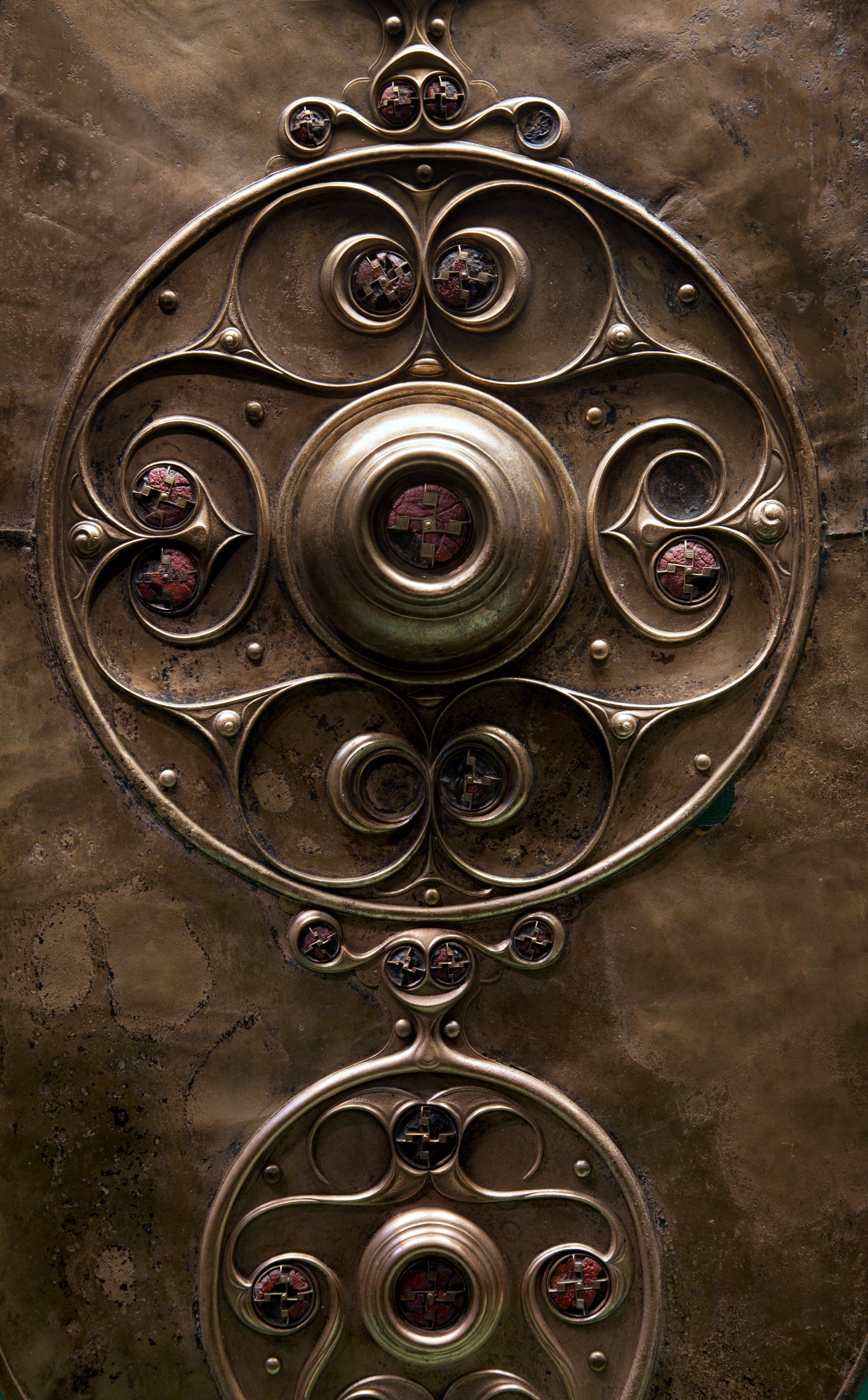
The Battersea Shield is one of the most significant pieces of ancient Celtic art found in Britain.

The earliest known evidence of human presence in what is now England was that of Homo antecessor, dating to about 780,000 years ago. The oldest proto-human bones discovered in England date from 500,000 years ago. Modern humans are known to have inhabited the area during the Upper Paleolithic period, though permanent settlements were only established within the last 6,000 years. After the last ice age only large mammals such as mammoths, bison and woolly rhinoceros remained. Roughly 11,000 years ago, when the ice sheets began to recede, humans repopulated the area; genetic research suggests they came from the northern part of the Iberian Peninsula. The sea level was lower than the present day and Britain was connected by land bridge to Ireland and Eurasia. As the seas rose, it was separated from Ireland 10,000 years ago and from Eurasia two millennia later. Neolithic farmers from the Iberian Peninsula migrated to the region around 4100 BC.

The Beaker culture arrived around 2,500 BC, introducing drinking and food vessels constructed from clay, as well as vessels used as reduction pots to smelt copper ores. It was during this time that major Neolithic monuments such as Stonehenge (phase III) and Avebury were constructed. By heating together tin and copper, which were in abundance in the area, the Beaker culture people made bronze, and later iron from iron ores. The development of iron smelting allowed the construction of better ploughs, advancing agriculture (for instance, with Celtic fields), as well as the production of more effective weapons.

During the Iron Age, Celtic culture, deriving from the Hallstatt and La Tène cultures, arrived from Central Europe. Brythonic was the spoken language during this time. Society was tribal; according to Ptolemy's Geographia there were around 20 tribes in the area. Like other regions on the edge of the Empire, Britain had long enjoyed trading links with the Romans. Julius Caesar of the Roman Republic attempted to invade twice in 55 and 54 BC; although largely unsuccessful, he managed to set up a client king from the Trinovantes.

=== Ancient history ===
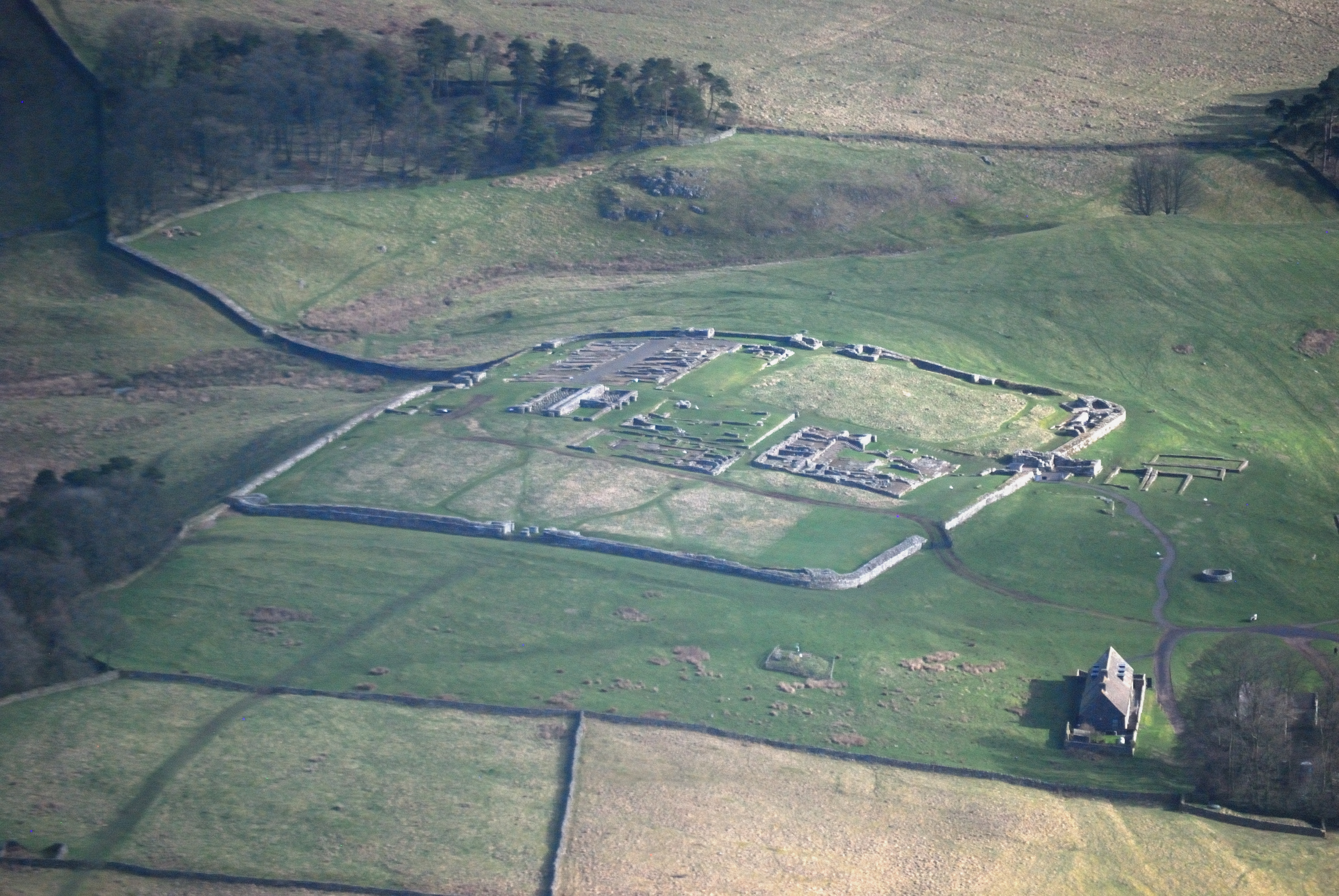
Housesteads Roman fort, Northumberland, the northern limit of Roman England

The Romans invaded Britain in 43 AD during the reign of Emperor Claudius, subsequently conquering much of Britain, and the area was incorporated into the Roman Empire as Britannia province. The best-known of the native tribes who attempted to resist were the Catuvellauni led by Caratacus. Later, an uprising led by Boudica, Queen of the Iceni, ended with Boudica's suicide following her defeat at the Battle of Watling Street. The author of one study of Roman Britain suggested that from 43 AD to 84 AD, the Roman invaders killed somewhere between 100,000 and 250,000 people from a population of perhaps 2,000,000. This era saw a Greco-Roman culture prevail with the introduction of Roman law, Roman architecture, aqueducts, sewers, agricultural items and silk. In the early 3rd century, Emperor Septimius Severus died at Eboracum (present-day York), where Constantine was proclaimed emperor in 306 AD.

There is debate about when Christianity was first introduced; it was no later than the 4th century, probably much earlier. According to Bede, missionaries were sent from Rome by Eleutherius at the request of the chieftain Lucius of Britain in 180 AD, to settle differences as to Eastern and Western ceremonials, which were disturbing the church. There are traditions linked to Glastonbury claiming an introduction through Joseph of Arimathea, while others claim through Lucius of Britain. By 410, during the decline of the Roman Empire, Britain was left exposed by the end of Roman rule in Britain and the withdrawal of Roman army units, to defend the frontiers in continental Europe and partake in civil wars. Celtic Christian monastic and missionary movements flourished. This period of Christianity was influenced by ancient Celtic culture in its sensibilities, polity, practices and theology. Local "congregations" were centred in the monastic community and monastic leaders were more like chieftains, as peers, rather than in the more hierarchical system of the Roman-dominated church.

=== Middle Ages ===
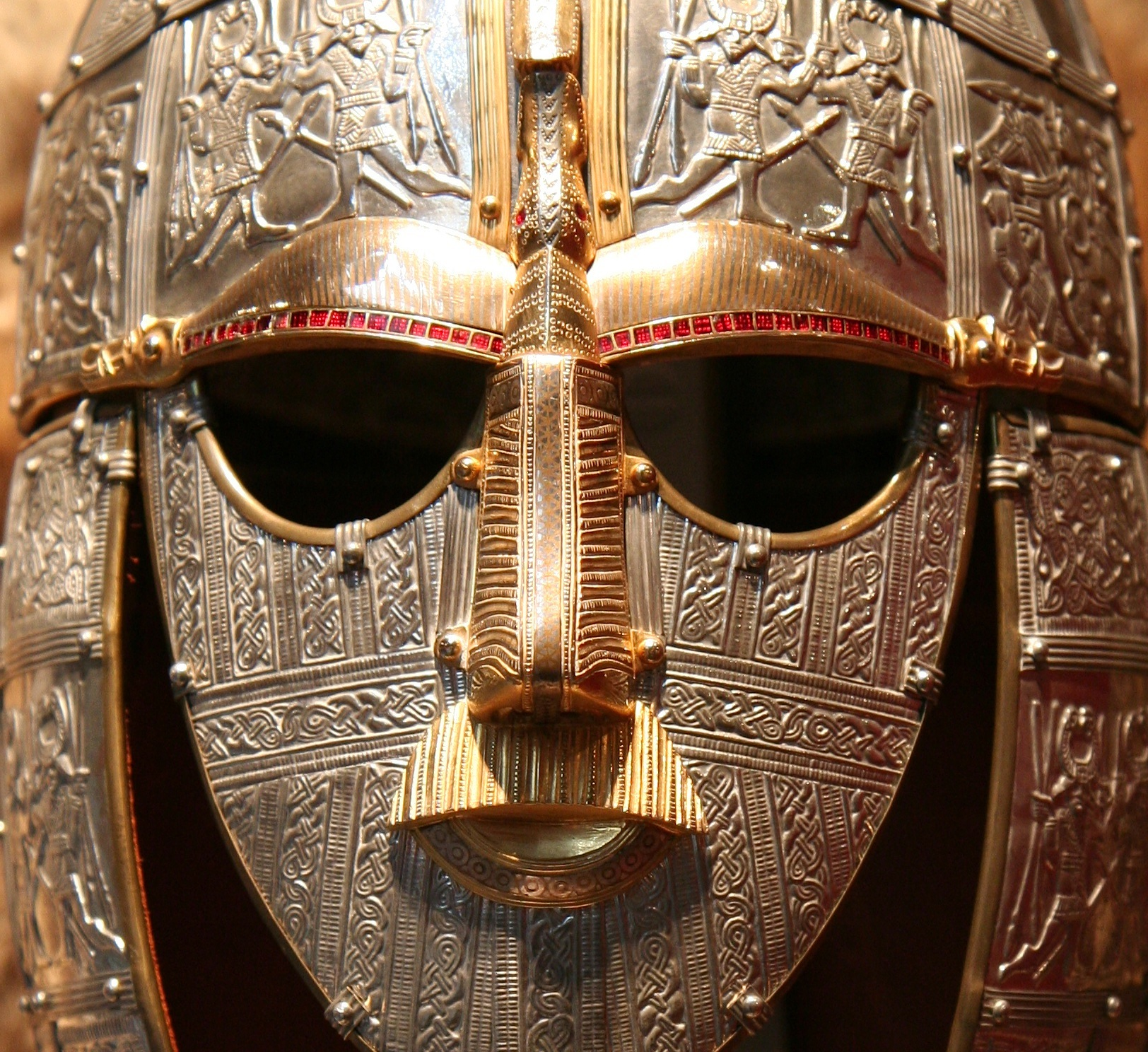
Replica of the 7th-century ceremonial Sutton Hoo helmet from the Kingdom of East Anglia

Roman military withdrawals left Britain open to invasion by pagan, seafaring warriors from north-western continental Europe, chiefly the Saxons, Angles, Jutes and Frisians who had long raided the coasts of the Roman province. These groups then began to settle in increasing numbers over the course of the fifth and sixth centuries, initially in the eastern part of the country. Their advance was contained for some decades after the Britons' victory at the Battle of Mount Badon, but subsequently resumed, overrunning the fertile lowlands of Britain and reducing the area under Brittonic control to a series of separate enclaves in the more rugged country to the west by the end of the 6th century. Contemporary texts describing this period are extremely scarce, giving rise to its description as a Dark Age. Details of the Anglo-Saxon settlement of Britain are consequently subject to considerable disagreement; the emerging consensus is that it occurred on a large scale in the south and east but was less substantial to the north and west, where Celtic languages continued to be spoken even in areas under Anglo-Saxon control. Roman-dominated Christianity had, in general, been replaced in the conquered territories by Anglo-Saxon paganism, but was reintroduced by missionaries from Rome led by Augustine from 597. Disputes between the Roman- and Celtic-dominated forms of Christianity ended in victory for the Roman tradition at the Council of Whitby (664), which was ostensibly about tonsures (clerical haircuts) and the date of Easter, but more significantly, about the differences in Roman and Celtic forms of authority, theology, and practice.

During the settlement period the lands ruled by the incomers seem to have been fragmented into numerous tribal territories, but by the 7th century, when substantial evidence of the situation again becomes available, these had coalesced into roughly a dozen kingdoms including Northumbria, Mercia, Wessex, East Anglia, Essex, Kent and Sussex. Over the following centuries, this process of political consolidation continued. The 7th century saw a struggle for hegemony between Northumbria and Mercia, which in the 8th century gave way to Mercian preeminence. In the early 9th century Mercia was displaced as the foremost kingdom by Wessex. Later in that century escalating attacks by the Danes culminated in the conquest of the north and east of England, overthrowing the kingdoms of Northumbria, Mercia and East Anglia. Wessex under Alfred the Great was left as the only surviving English kingdom, and under his successors, it steadily expanded at the expense of the kingdoms of the Danelaw. This brought about the political unification of England, first accomplished under Æthelstan in 927 and definitively established after further conflicts by Eadred in 953. A fresh wave of Scandinavian attacks from the late 10th century ended with the conquest of this united kingdom by Sweyn Forkbeard in 1013 and again by his son Cnut in 1016, turning it into the centre of a short-lived North Sea Empire that also included Denmark and Norway. However, the native royal dynasty was restored with the accession of Edward the Confessor in 1042.

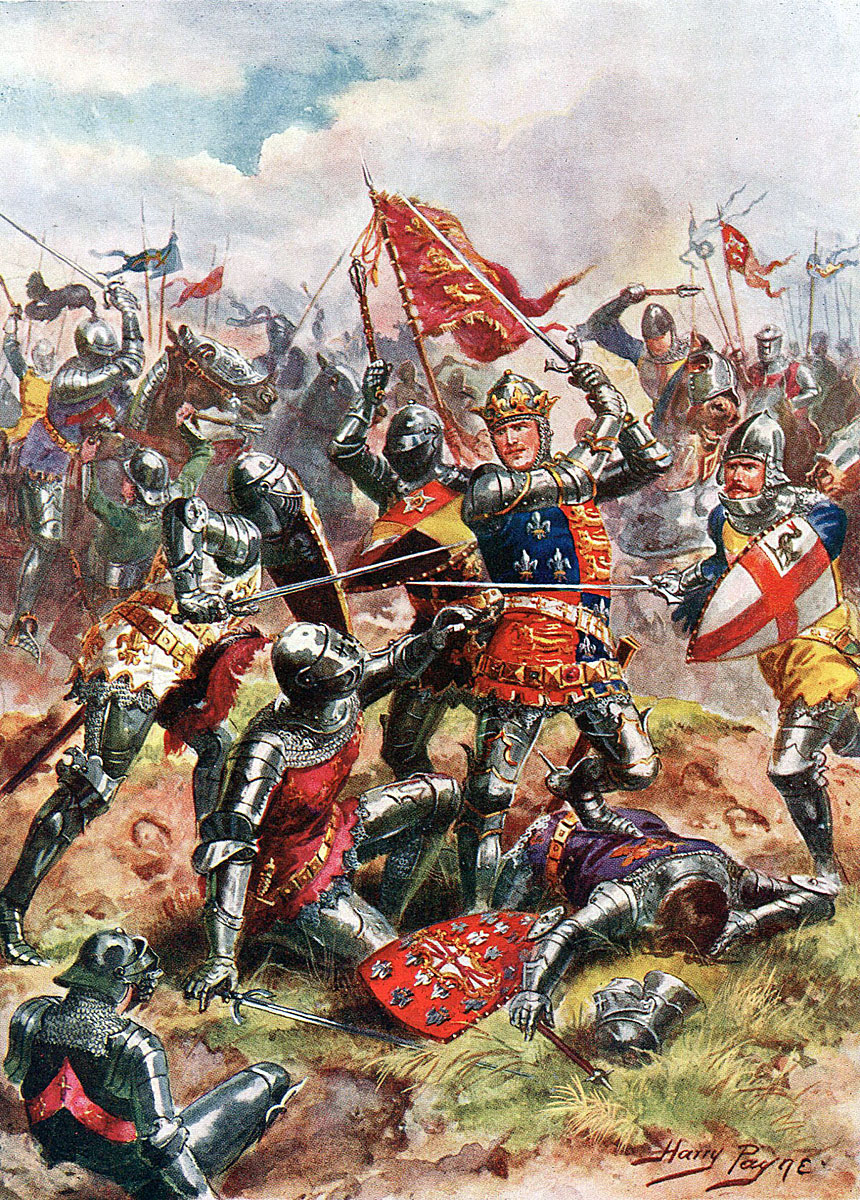
King Henry V at the Battle of Agincourt, fought on Saint Crispin's Day and concluded with an English victory against a larger French army in the Hundred Years' War

Following the death of Edward in January 1066, a disputed succession led to a two-front struggle in which King Harold Godwinson's late September victory at Stamford Bridge against a Norwegian invasion army led by Harald Hardrada was followed almost immediately by his defeat at Hastings by Duke William of Normandy on 14 October, securing a successful Norman Conquest of England. The Normans themselves originated from Scandinavia and had settled in Normandy in the late 9th and early 10th centuries. This conquest led to the almost total dispossession of the English elite and its replacement by a new French-speaking aristocracy, whose speech had a profound and permanent effect on the English language.

Subsequently, the House of Plantagenet from Anjou inherited the English throne under Henry II, adding England to the budding Angevin Empire of fiefs the family had inherited in France including Aquitaine. They reigned for three centuries, some noted monarchs being Richard I, Edward I, Edward III and Henry V. The period saw changes in trade and legislation, including the signing of Magna Carta, an English legal charter used to limit the sovereign's powers by law and protect the privileges of freemen. Catholic monasticism flourished, providing philosophers, and the universities of Oxford and Cambridge were founded with royal patronage. The Principality of Wales became a Plantagenet fief during the 13th century and the Lordship of Ireland was given to the English monarchy by the Pope. During the 14th century, the Plantagenets and the House of Valois claimed to be legitimate claimants to the House of Capet and of France; the two powers clashed in the Hundred Years' War. The Black Death epidemic hit England; starting in 1348, it eventually killed up to half of England's inhabitants.

Between 1453 and 1487, a civil war known as the War of the Roses waged between the two branches of the royal family, the Yorkists and Lancastrians. The Yorkists eventually lost the throne to the Tudors, a branch of the Lancastrians headed by Henry Tudor who invaded with Welsh and Breton mercenaries, gaining victory at the Battle of Bosworth Field where the Yorkist king Richard III was killed.

=== Early modern period ===
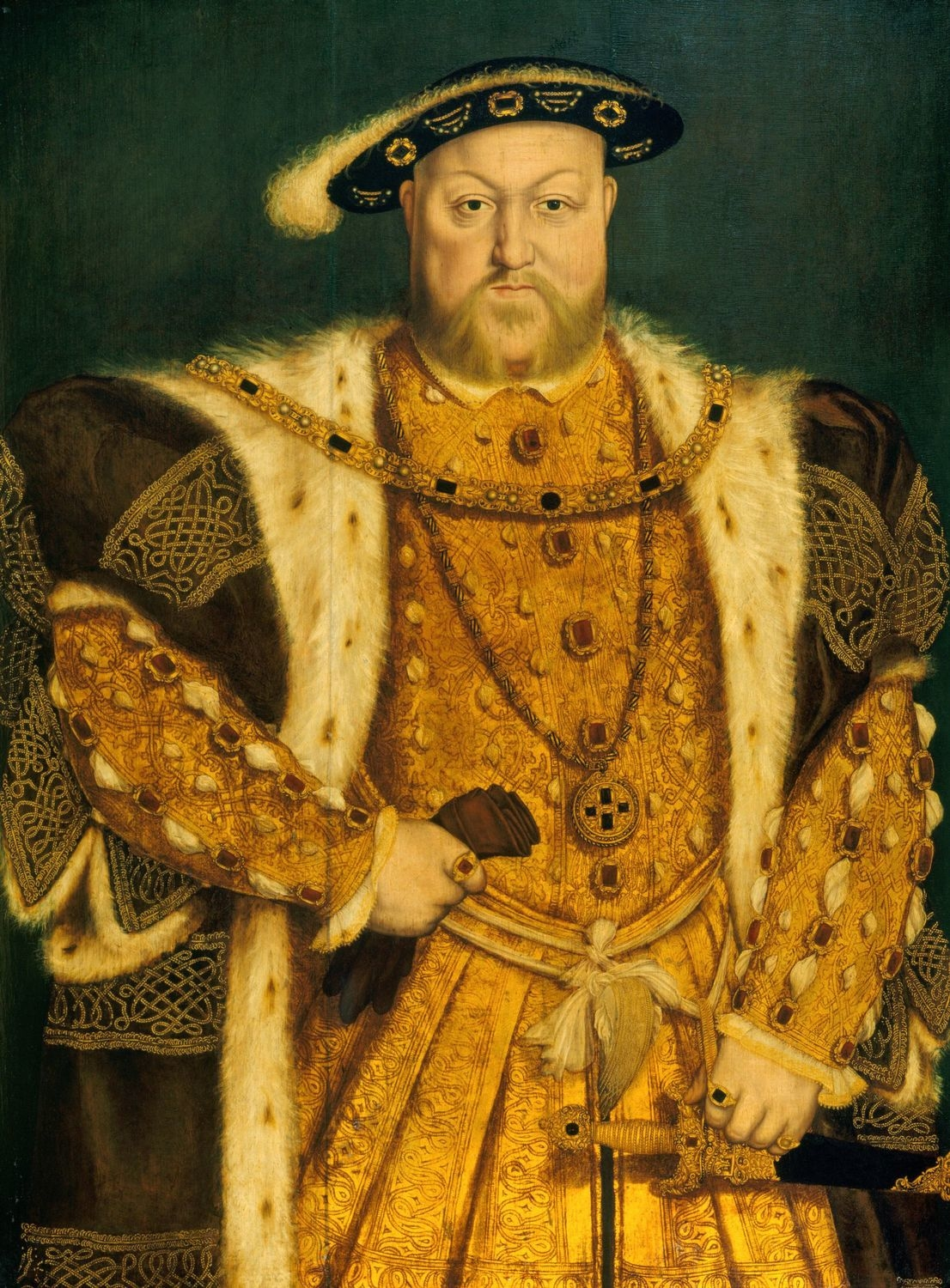
King Henry VIII (1491–1547)

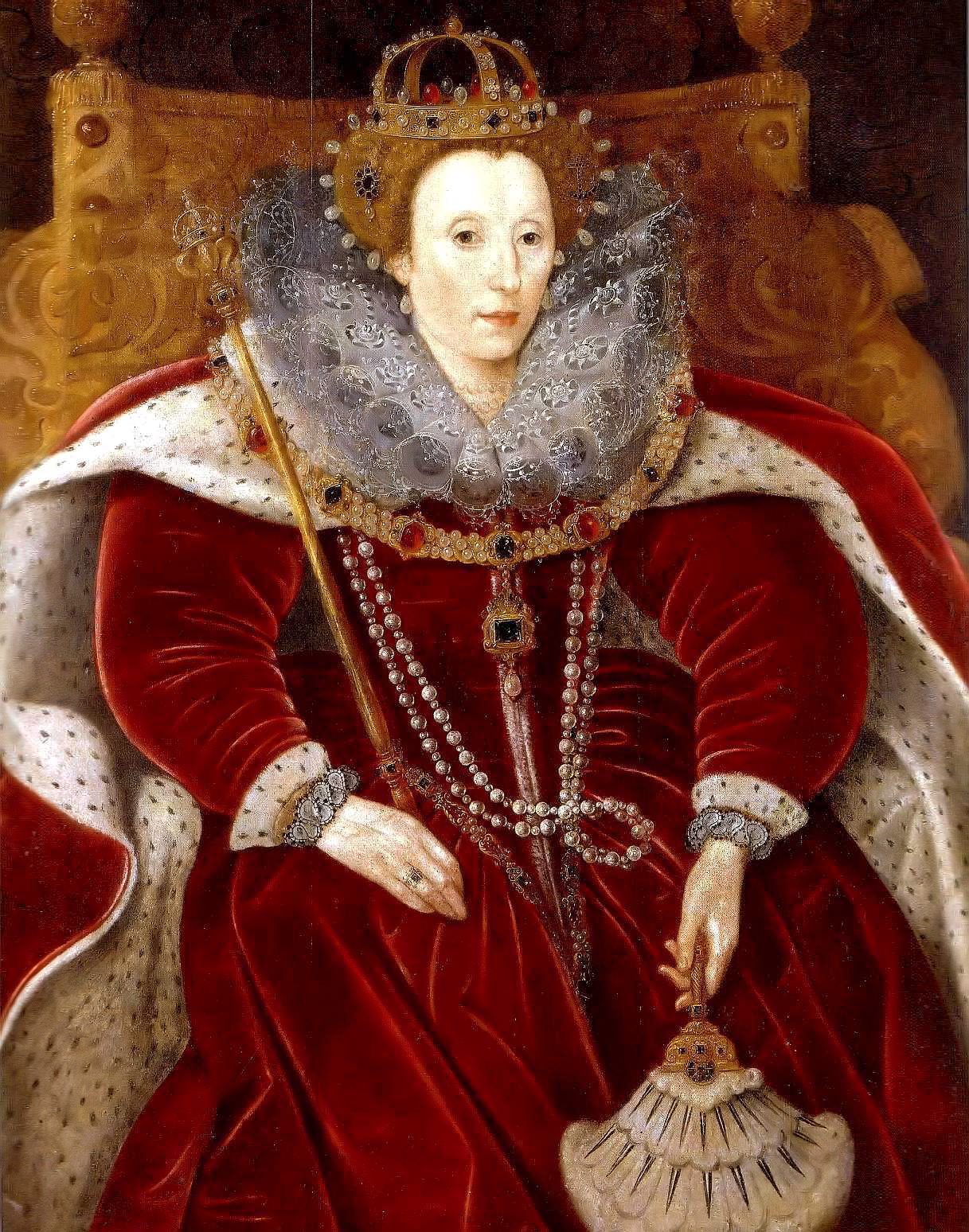
Queen Elizabeth I (1533–1603)

During the Tudor period, England began to develop a standing navy, and exploration intensified in the Age of Discovery. Henry VIII broke from communion with the Catholic Church, over issues relating to his divorce, under the Acts of Supremacy in 1534 which proclaimed the monarch head of the Church of England. In contrast with much of European Protestantism, the roots of the split were more political than theological. (Note: As Roger Scruton explains, "The Reformation must not be confused with the changes introduced into the Church of England during the "Reformation Parliament" of 1529–36, which were of a political rather than a religious nature, designed to unite the secular and religious sources of authority within a single sovereign power: the Anglican Church did not make substantial change in doctrine until later.") He also legally incorporated his ancestral land Wales into the Kingdom of England with the 1535–1542 acts. There were internal religious conflicts during the reigns of Henry's daughters, Mary I and Elizabeth I. The former took the country back to Catholicism while the latter broke from it again, forcefully asserting the supremacy of Anglicanism. The Elizabethan era is the epoch in the Tudor age of the reign of Queen Elizabeth I ("the Virgin Queen"). Historians often depict it as the golden age in English history that represented the apogee of the English Renaissance and saw the flowering of great art, drama, poetry, music and literature. England during this period had a centralised, well-organised, and effective government.

Competing with Spain, the first English colony in the Americas was founded in 1585 by explorer Walter Raleigh in Virginia and named Roanoke. The Roanoke colony failed and is known as the lost colony after it was found abandoned on the return of the late-arriving supply ship. With the East India Company, England also competed with the Dutch and French in the East. During the Elizabethan period, England was at war with Spain. An armada sailed from Spain in 1588 as part of a wider plan to invade England and re-establish a Catholic monarchy. This plan was thwarted by bad coordination, stormy weather and successful harrying attacks by an English fleet under Lord Howard of Effingham. The failure of the 1588 expedition did not deter Spain, which launched two further armadas in 1596 and 1597; however, these subsequent fleets were likewise dispersed by severe Atlantic storms.

=== Union with Scotland and English Civil War ===
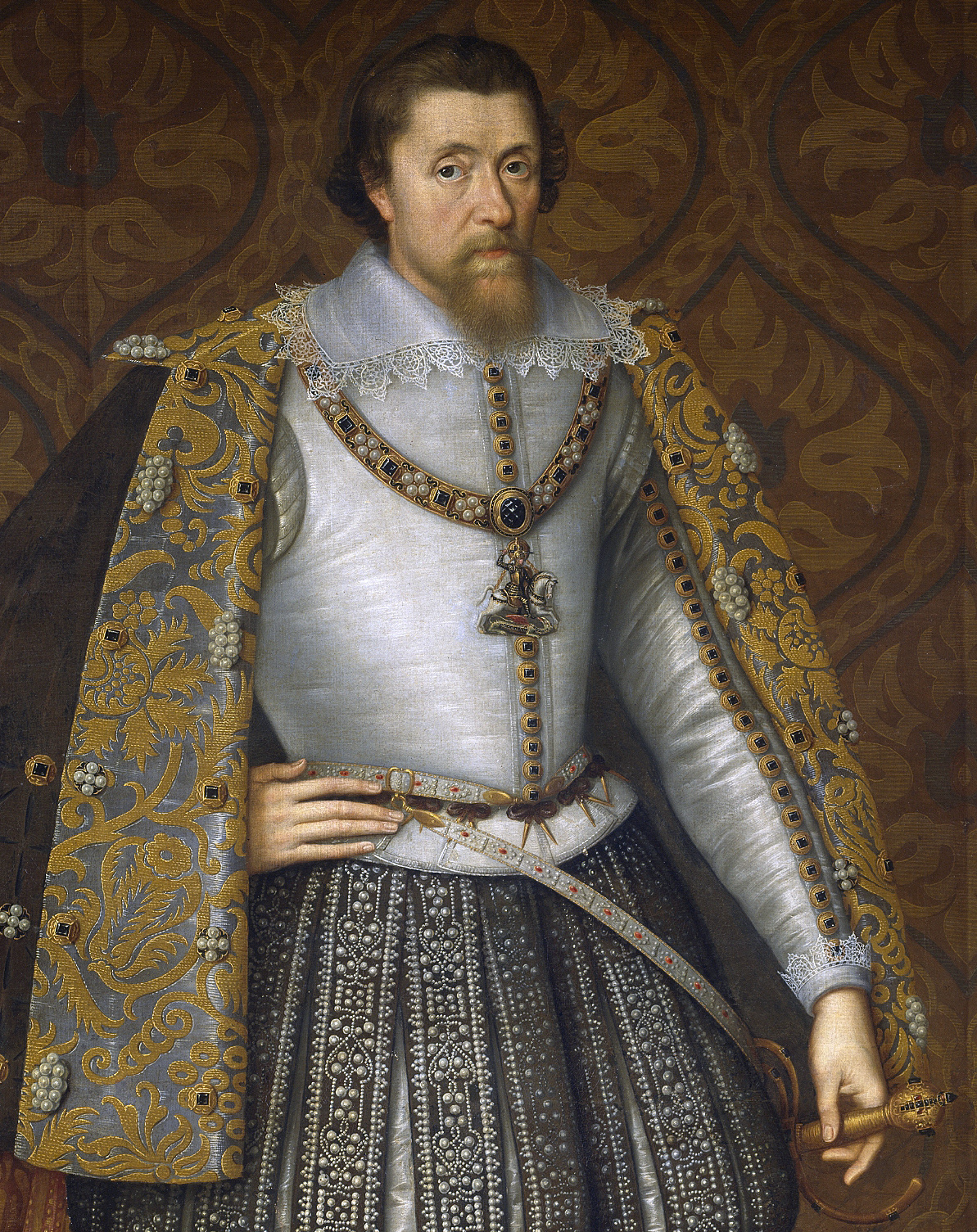
King of Scotland, James VI, became King of England as James I in 1603, forming the Union of the Crowns

The political structure of the island changed in 1603, when James VI, King of Scots, inherited the English throne as James I, thereby creating a personal union between the two rival realms. He styled himself King of Great Britain, although this had no basis in English law. Under the auspices of James VI and I the Authorised King James Version of the Holy Bible was published in 1611. It was the standard version of the Bible read by most Protestant Christians for four hundred years until modern revisions were produced in the 20th century.

Based on conflicting political, religious and social positions, the English Civil War was fought between the supporters of Parliament and those of King Charles I, known colloquially as Roundheads and Cavaliers respectively. This was an interwoven part of the wider multifaceted Wars of the Three Kingdoms, involving Scotland and Ireland. The Parliamentarians were victorious, Charles I was executed and the kingdom replaced by the Commonwealth. Leader of the Parliament forces, Oliver Cromwell declared himself Lord Protector in 1653; a period of personal rule followed. After Cromwell's death and the resignation of his son Richard as Lord Protector, Charles II was invited to return as monarch in 1660, in a move called the Restoration. With the reopening of theatres, fine arts, literature and performing arts flourished throughout the Restoration of the "Merry Monarch" Charles II. After the Glorious Revolution of 1688, it was constitutionally established that King and Parliament should rule together, though Parliament would have the real power. This was established with the Bill of Rights in 1689. Amongst the statutes set down were that the law could only be made by Parliament and could not be suspended by the King, also that the King could not impose taxes or raise an army without the prior approval of Parliament. Also since that time, no British monarch has entered the House of Commons when it is sitting, which is annually commemorated at the State Opening of Parliament by the British monarch when the doors of the House of Commons are slammed in the face of the monarch's messenger, symbolising the rights of Parliament and its independence from the monarch. With the founding of the Royal Society in 1660, science was greatly encouraged.

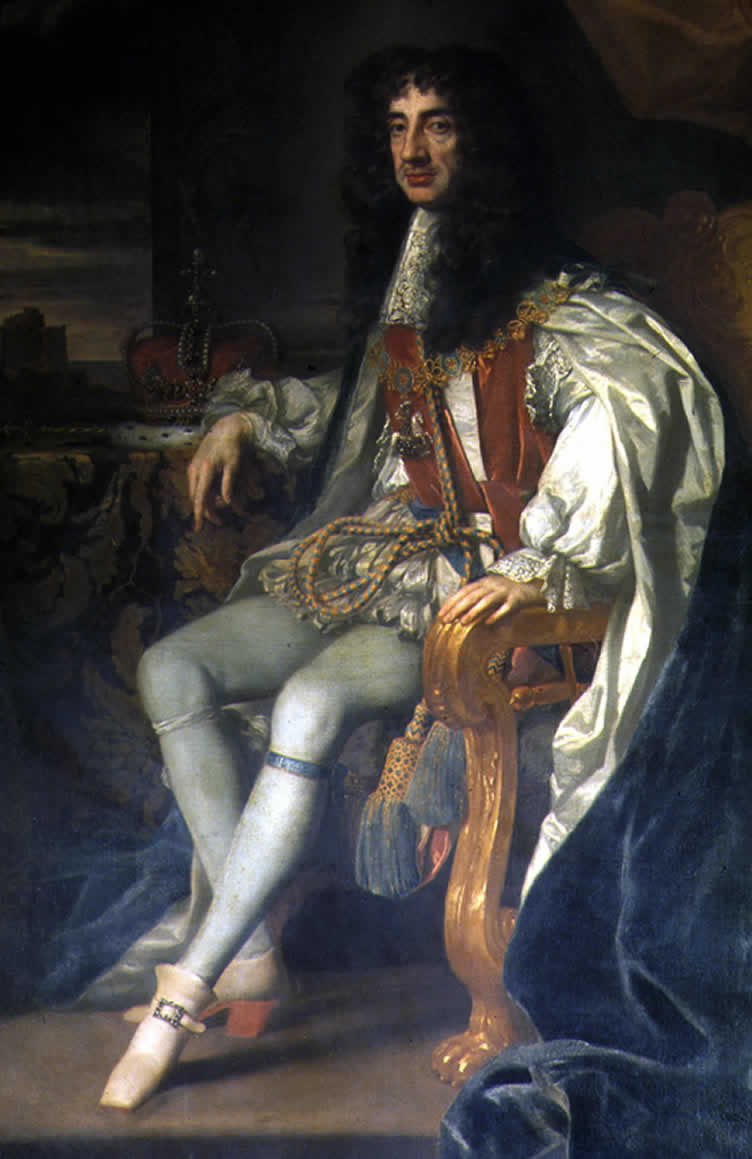
The English Restoration restored the monarchy under King Charles II and peace after the English Civil War.

In 1666, the Great Fire of London gutted the city of London, but it was rebuilt shortly afterward with many significant buildings designed by Sir Christopher Wren. By the mid-to-late 17th century, two political factions had emerged – the Tories and Whigs. Though the Tories initially supported Catholic king James II, some of them, along with the Whigs, during the Revolution of 1688 invited the Dutch Prince William of Orange to defeat James and become the king. Some English people, primarily in the north, were Jacobites and continued to support James and his sons. Under the Stuart dynasty England expanded in trade, finance and prosperity. The Royal Navy developed Europe's largest merchant fleet. After the parliaments of England and Scotland agreed, the two countries joined in political union, to create the Kingdom of Great Britain in 1707. To accommodate the union, institutions such as the law and national churches of each remained separate.

=== Late modern and contemporary periods ===
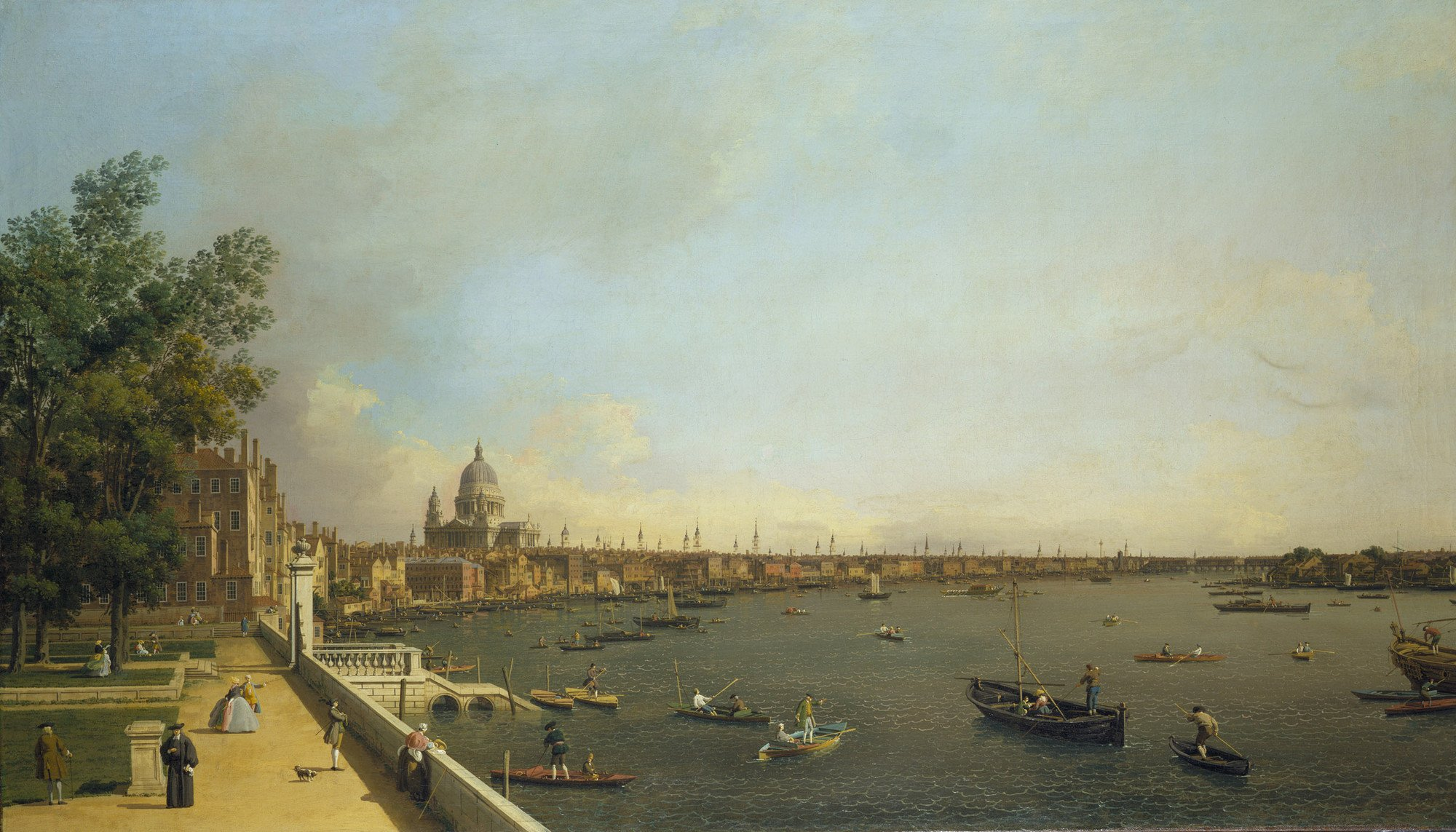
The River Thames during the Georgian period from the Terrace of Somerset House looking towards St. Paul's, c. 1750

Following the formation of the Kingdom of Great Britain, output from the Royal Society and other English initiatives combined with the Scottish Enlightenment to create innovations in science and engineering, while the enormous growth in British overseas trade protected by the Royal Navy paved the way for the establishment of the British Empire. Domestically it drove the Industrial Revolution, a period of profound change in the socioeconomic and cultural conditions of England, resulting in industrialised agriculture, manufacture, engineering and mining, as well as new and pioneering road, rail and water networks to facilitate their expansion and development. The opening of Northwest England's Bridgewater Canal in 1761 ushered in the canal age in Britain. In 1825, the world's first permanent steam locomotive-hauled passenger railway – the Stockton and Darlington Railway – opened to the public.

During the Industrial Revolution, many workers moved from England's countryside to new and expanding urban industrial areas to work in factories, for instance at Birmingham and Manchester, with the latter the world's first industrial city. England maintained relative stability throughout the French Revolution, under George III and William Pitt the Younger. The regency of George IV is noted for its elegance and achievements in the fine arts and architecture. During the Napoleonic Wars, Napoleon planned to invade from the south-east; however, this failed to manifest and the Napoleonic forces were defeated by the British: at sea by Horatio Nelson, and on land by Arthur Wellesley. The victory at the Battle of Trafalgar confirmed the naval supremacy Britain had established during the eighteenth century. The Napoleonic Wars fostered a concept of Britishness and a united national British people, shared with the English, Scots and Welsh.

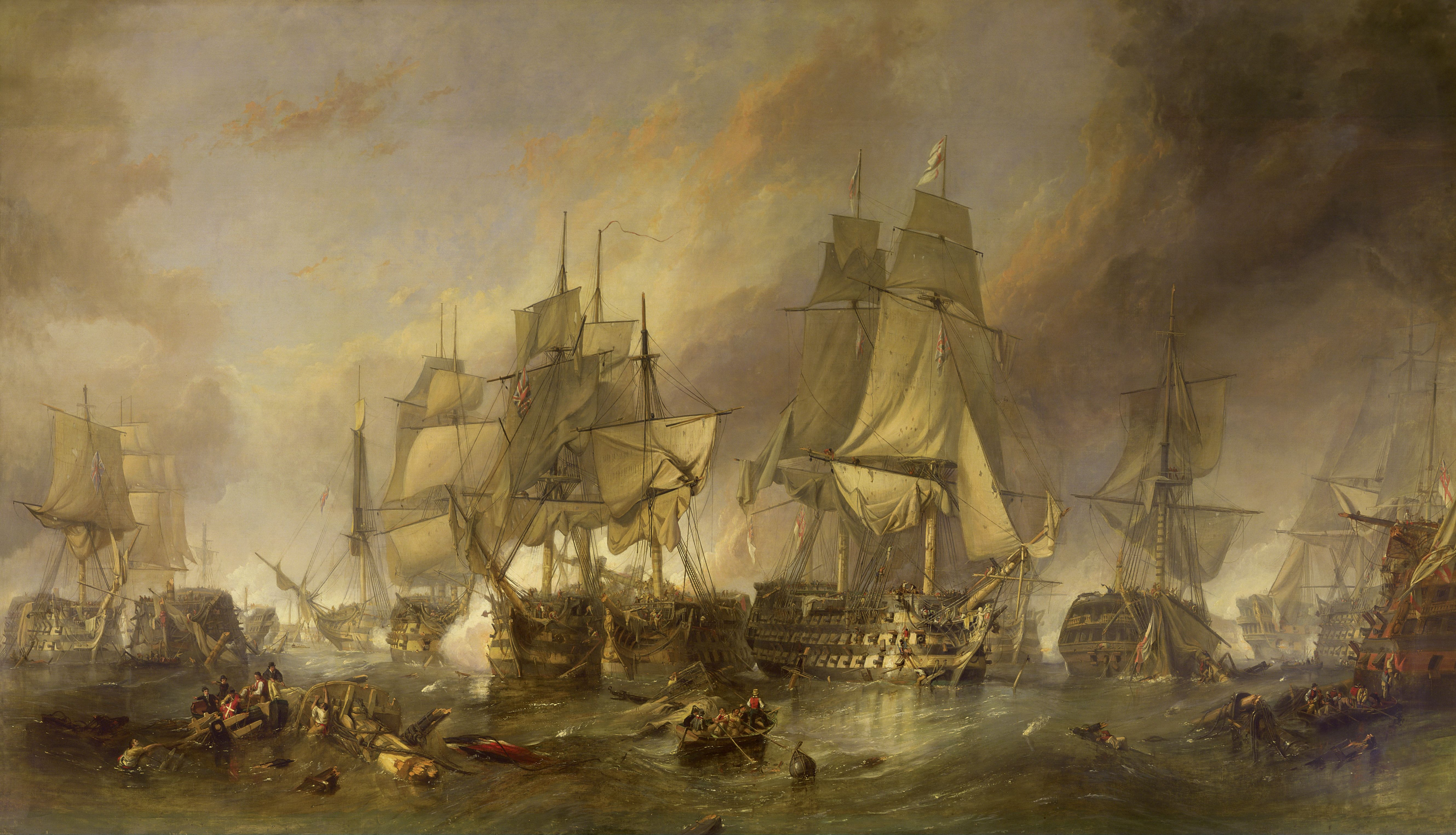
The Battle of Trafalgar was a naval engagement between the Royal Navy and the combined fleets of France and Spain during the Napoleonic Wars.

London became the largest and most populous metropolitan area in the world during the Victorian era, and trade within the British Empire – as well as the standing of the British military and navy – was prestigious. Technologically, this era saw many innovations that proved key to the United Kingdom's power and prosperity. Political agitation at home from radicals such as the Chartists and the suffragettes enabled legislative reform and universal suffrage.

Power shifts in east-central Europe led to World War I; hundreds of thousands of English soldiers died fighting for the United Kingdom as part of the Allies. (Note: Figure of 550,000 military deaths is for England and Wales.) Two decades later, in World War II, the United Kingdom was again one of the Allies. Developments in warfare technology saw many cities damaged by air-raids during the Blitz. Following the war, the British Empire experienced rapid decolonisation, and there was a speeding-up of technological innovations; automobiles became the primary means of transport and Frank Whittle's development of the jet engine led to wider air travel. Residential patterns were altered in England by private motoring, and by the creation of the National Health Service in 1948, providing publicly funded health care to all permanent residents free at the point of need. Combined, these prompted the reform of local government in England in the mid-20th century.

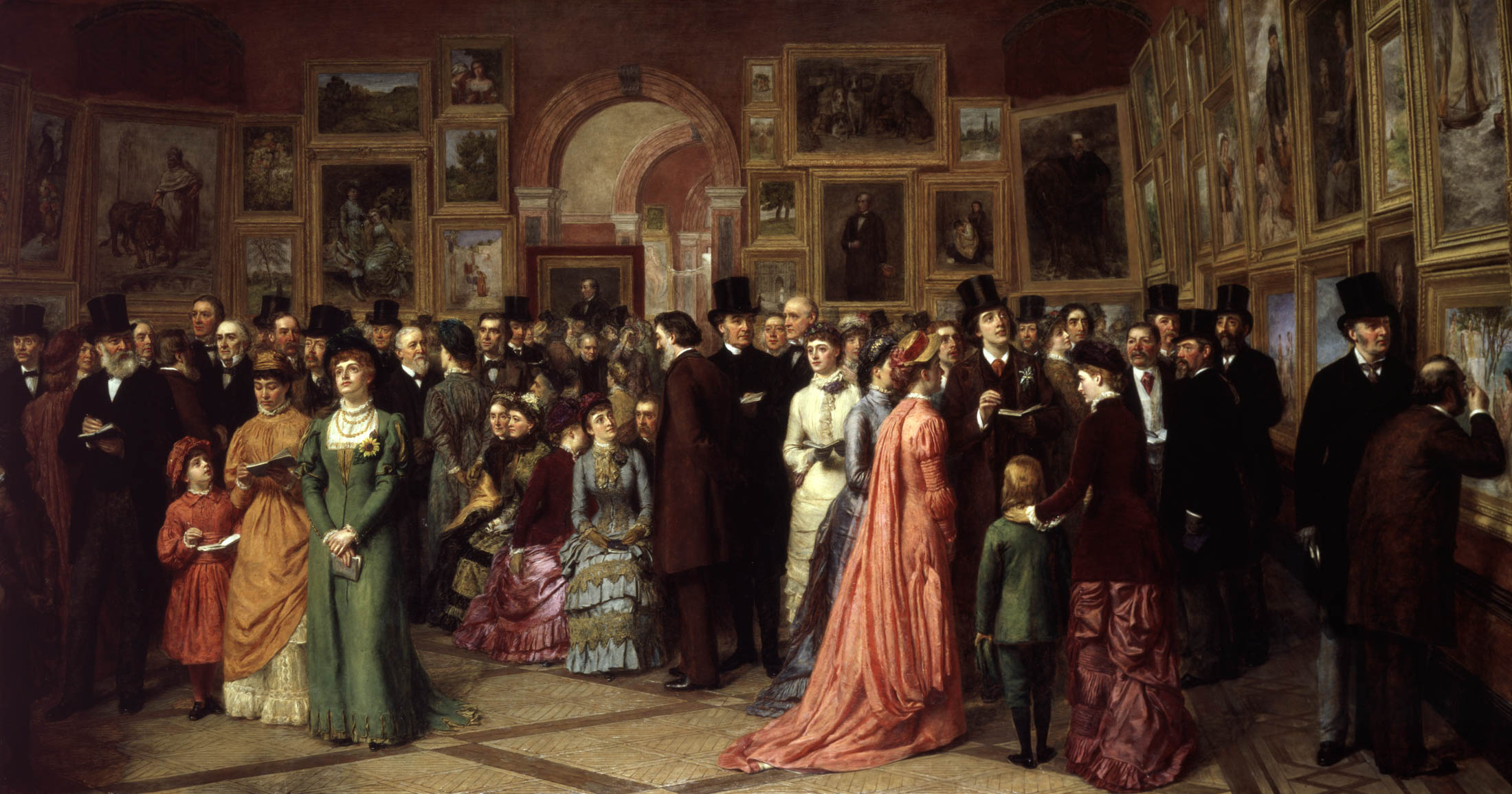
The Victorian era is often cited as a Golden Age. Painting done by William Powell Frith to show cultural divisions.

Since the 20th century, there has been significant population movement to England, mostly from other parts of the British Isles, but also from the Commonwealth, particularly the Indian subcontinent. Since the 1970s, there has been a large move away from manufacturing and an increasing emphasis on the service industry. As part of the United Kingdom, the area joined a common market initiative called the European Economic Community which became the European Union.

Since the late 20th century, the administration of the United Kingdom has moved towards devolved governance in Scotland, Wales and Northern Ireland. England and Wales continues to exist as a jurisdiction within the United Kingdom. Devolution has stimulated a greater emphasis on a more English-specific identity and patriotism. There is no devolved English government, but an attempt to create a similar system on a sub-regional basis was rejected by referendum.

== Governance ==
England is part of the United Kingdom, a constitutional monarchy with a parliamentary system. There has not been a government of England since 1707, when the Acts of Union 1707, putting into effect the terms of the Treaty of Union, joined England and Scotland to form the Kingdom of Great Britain. Before the union England was ruled by its monarch and the Parliament of England.

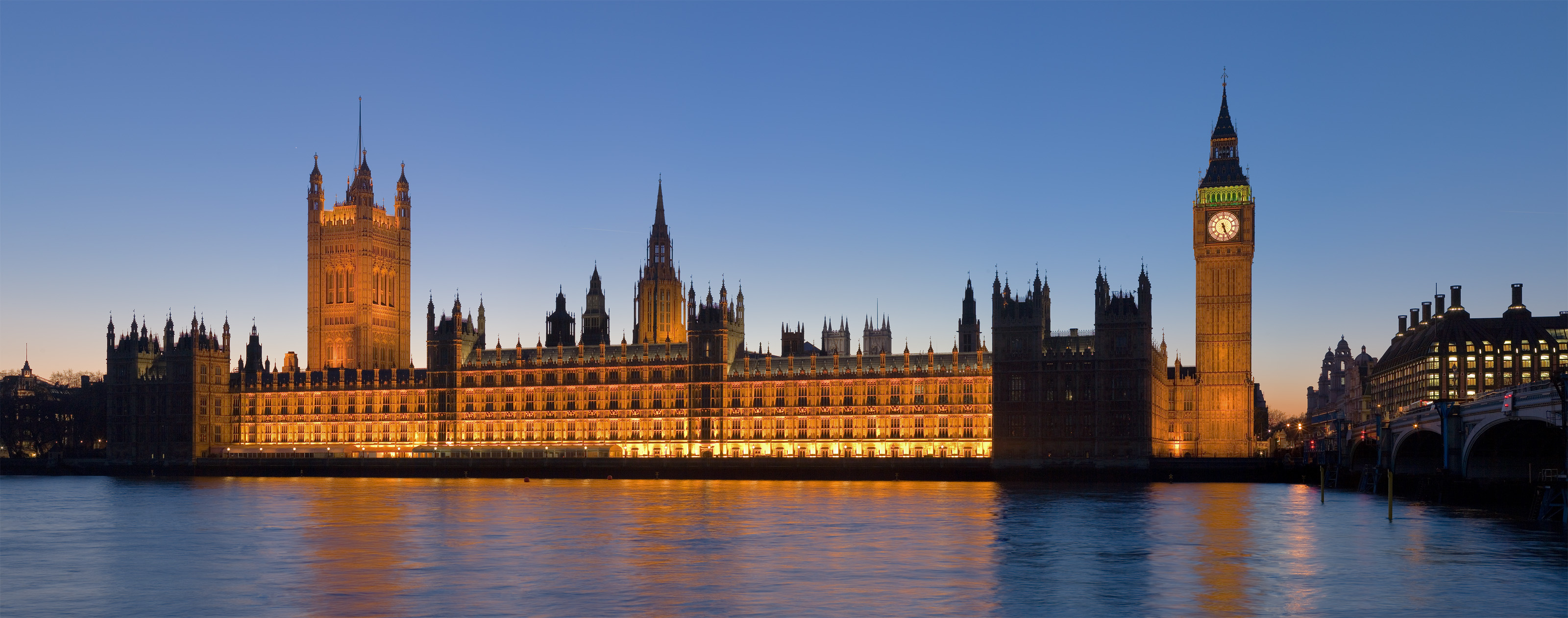
The Palace of Westminster, the seat of the Parliament of the United Kingdom in which England is directly governed

England is governed directly by the Parliament of the United Kingdom, although other countries of the United Kingdom have devolved governments. There has been debate about how to counterbalance this in England. Originally it was planned that various regions of England would be devolved, but following the proposal's rejection by the North East in a 2004 referendum, this has not been carried out. In 2024, an England-only intergovernmental body, known as the Mayoral Council for England, was established to bring together ministers from the UK Government, the Mayor of London and the leaders of combined authorities.

In 2026 the English Devolution and Community Empowerment Act 2026 received royal assent and established a three tier system of Governance consisting of National, Strategic Authorities and Principal Authorities.

=== Politics ===
In the House of Commons which is the lower house of the British Parliament based at the Palace of Westminster, there are 543 members of parliament (MPs) for constituencies in England, out of the 650 total. England is represented by 347 MPs from the Labour Party, 116 from the Conservative Party, 65 from the Liberal Democrats, four for Reform UK and four for the Green Party of England and Wales.

=== Tiers of Governance ===
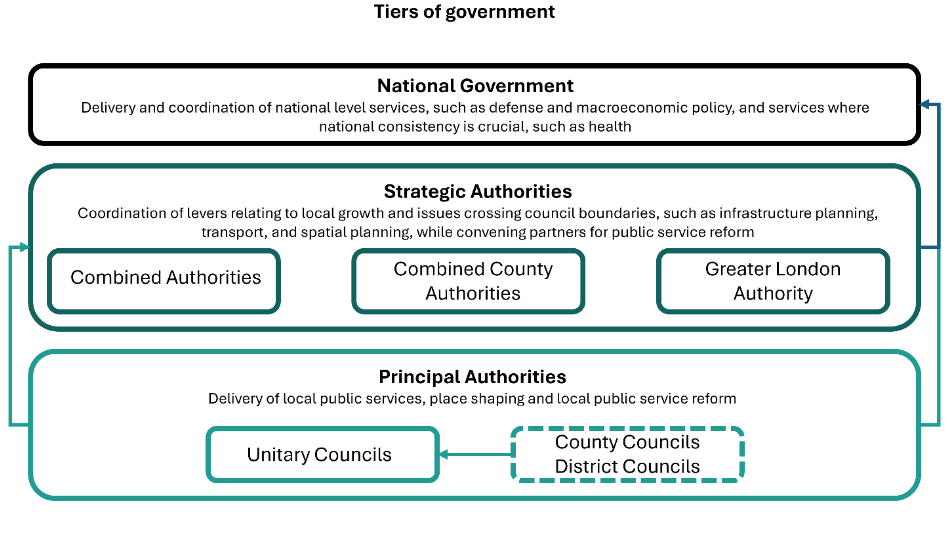
Tiers of Government in England

There are currently three overarching categories of governance in England – National, Strategic Authority and Principal Authorities.

==== National ====
England does not have its own Devolved Parliament, unlike Scotland (Scottish Parliament), Wales (Welsh Senedd) and Northern Ireland (Northern Ireland Assembly). Instead the U.K Parliament creates legislation for England.

==== Strategic Authority ====
Diagram of English strategic authorities

Strategic Authorities are sub-regional entities consisting of Combined and County Combined Authorities and the Greater London Authority.

As of 2026 there are currently 18 Combined and County Combined Authorities in England, with 16 of those having a directly elected mayor.

From 1994 until the early 2010s England was divided for a few purposes into regions; a 1998 referendum for the London Region created the London Assembly two years later. A failed 2004 North East England devolution referendum cancelled further regional assembly devolution with the regional structure outside London abolished.

==== Principal Authorities ====
Principal Authorities consist of unitary councils, district councils and county councils. Outside the London region, England's highest tier is the 48 ceremonial counties. These are used primarily as a geographical frame of reference. Of these, 38 have developed gradually since the Middle Ages; these were reformed to 51 in 1974 and to their current number in 1996. Each has a Lord Lieutenant and a High Sheriff; these appointees represent the British monarch locally. Some counties, such as Herefordshire, are only divided further into civil parishes. The royal county of Berkshire and the metropolitan counties have a different status from other ceremonial counties. In 1974, the Local Government Act 1972 created a two-tier system in England with 39 non-metropolitan (shire) counties and 6 metropolitan counties. The shire counties were two-tier (county council + district councils), while the metropolitan counties had a different division of functions.

The metropolitan county councils were abolished in 1986. Further reforms in the mid-1990s (mainly 1995–1998) replaced two-tier structures with unitary authorities in many areas. The 1996 changes formally separated ceremonial counties (for lieutenancy and ceremonial purposes) from administrative counties (for local government).

This created clearer distinction: ceremonial counties often follow historic or adjusted boundaries, while administrative areas reflect current unitary or two-tier council structures.

Administratively, London comprises 32 London boroughs and the City of London. The 32 London boroughs form the ceremonial county of Greater London, with the City of London being a separate ceremonial county.

England is also divided into local government districts. The district can align to a ceremonial county, or be a district tier within a shire county, be a royal or metropolitan borough, have borough or city status, or be a unitary authority, London for example has 33 local government districts.

At the community level, much of England is divided into civil parishes with their own councils; in Greater London only one such parish, Queen's Park, exists as of 2014 after they were abolished in 1965 until legislation allowed their recreation in 2007.

=== Law ===
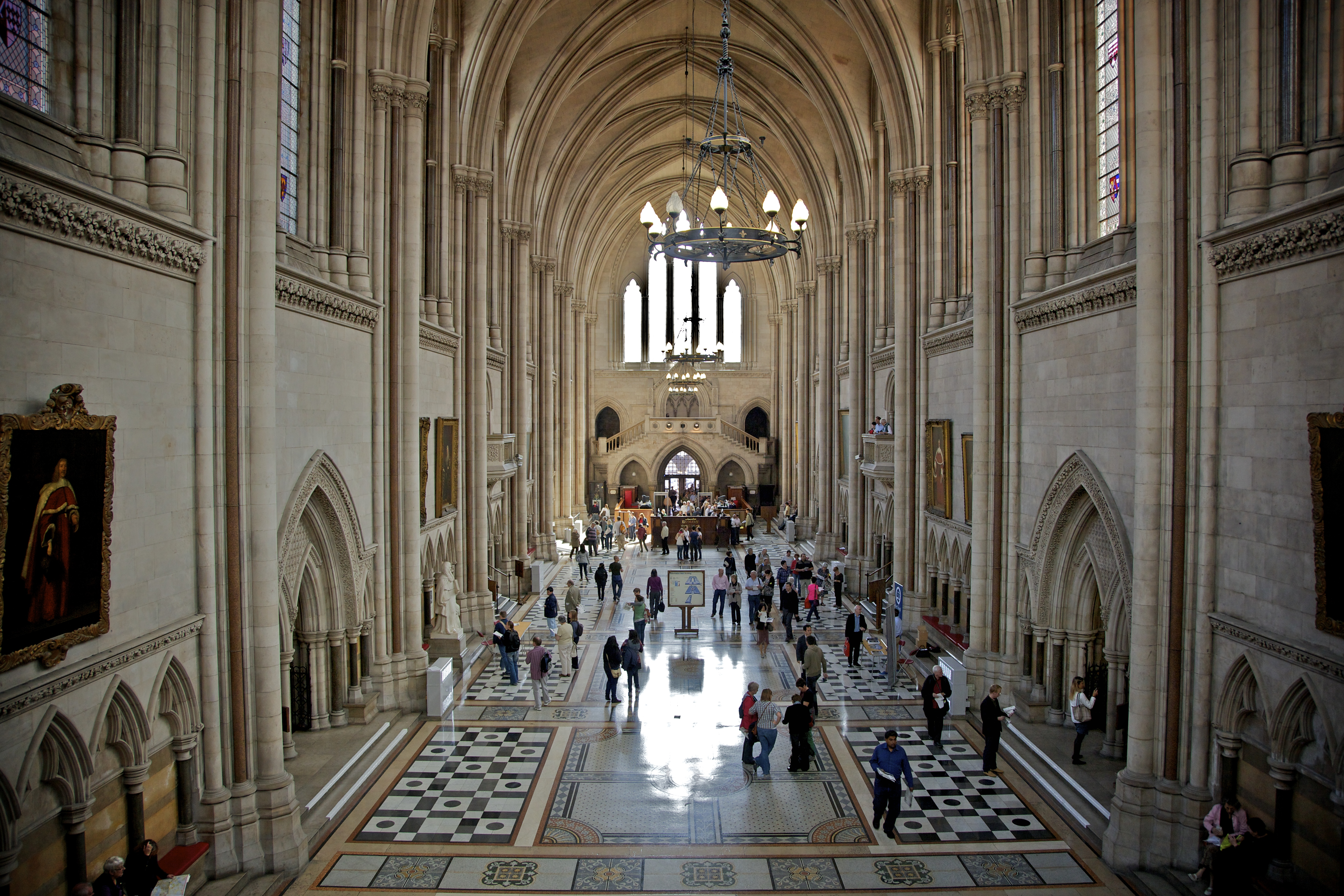
The Royal Courts of Justice

The English law legal system, developed over the centuries, is the basis of common law legal systems used in most Commonwealth countries and the United States (except Louisiana). Despite now being part of the United Kingdom, the legal system of the Courts of England and Wales continued, under the Treaty of Union, as a separate legal system from the one used in Scotland. The general essence of English law is that it is made by judges sitting in courts, applying their common sense and knowledge of legal precedent – stare decisis – to the facts before them.

The court system is headed by the Senior Courts of England and Wales, consisting of the Court of Appeal, the High Court of Justice for civil cases, and the Crown Court for criminal cases. The Supreme Court of the United Kingdom is the highest court for criminal and civil cases in England and Wales. It was created in 2009 after constitutional changes, taking over the judicial functions of the House of Lords. A decision of the Supreme Court is binding on every other court in the hierarchy, which must follow its directions.

The secretary of state for justice is the minister responsible to Parliament for the judiciary, the court system and prisons and probation in England. Crime increased between 1981 and 1995 but fell by 42% in the period 1995–2006. The prison population doubled over the same period, giving it one of the highest incarceration rates in Western Europe at 147 per 100,000. His Majesty's Prison Service, reporting to the Ministry of Justice, manages most prisons, housing in 2024 around 87,300 prisoners in England and Wales, the most since 1900.

== Geography ==
=== Landscape and rivers ===
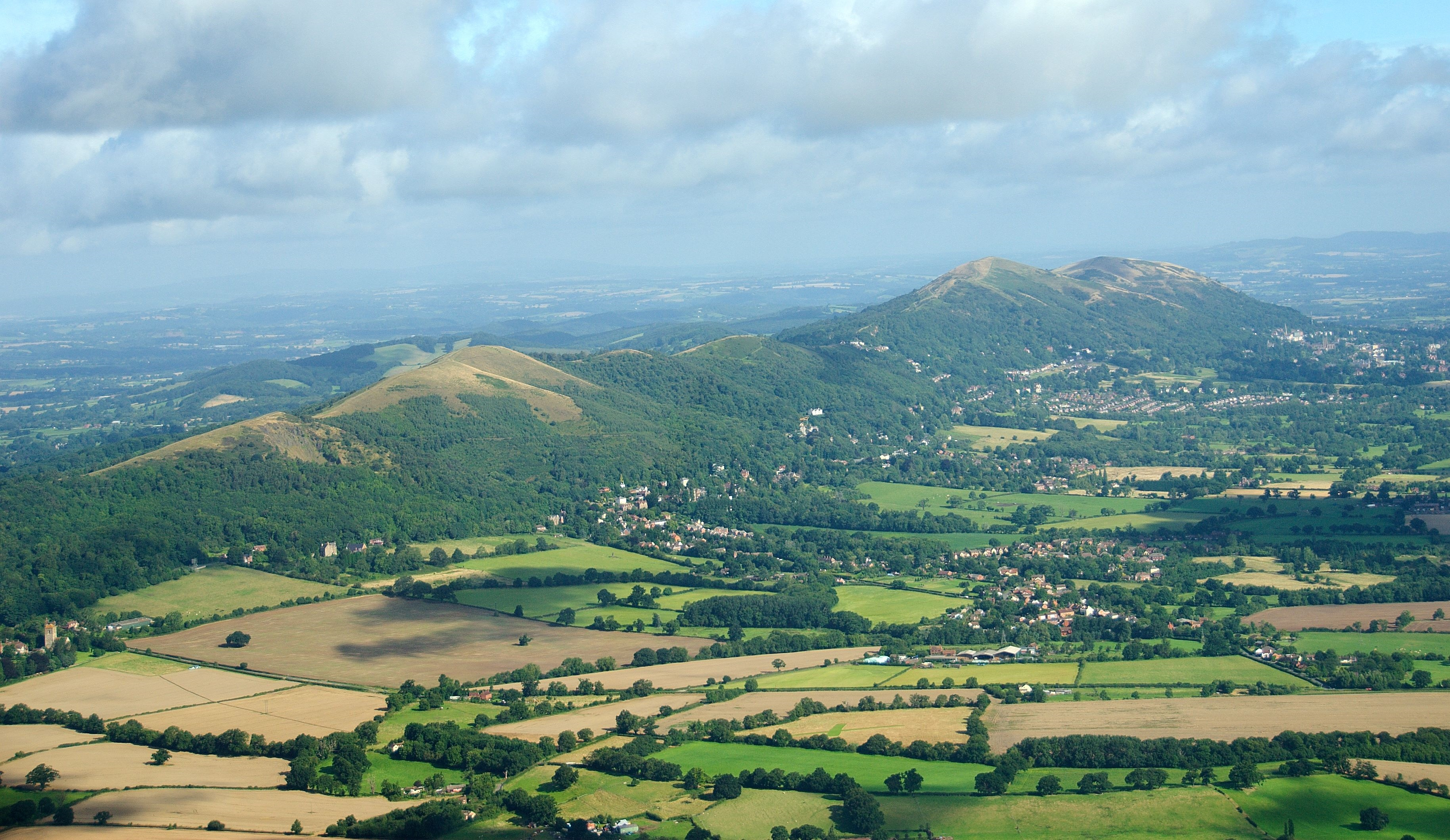
The Malvern Hills located in the English counties of Worcestershire and Herefordshire. The hills have been designated by the Countryside Agency as an Area of Outstanding Natural Beauty.

Geographically, England includes the central and southern two-thirds of the island of Great Britain, plus such offshore islands as the Isle of Wight and the Isles of Scilly. It is bordered by two other countries of the United Kingdom: to the north by Scotland and to the west by Wales.

England is closer than any other part of mainland Britain to the European continent. It is separated from France (Hauts-de-France) by a 21-mile (34 km) sea gap, though the two countries are connected by the Channel Tunnel near Folkestone. England also has shores on the Irish Sea, North Sea and Atlantic Ocean.

The ports of London, Liverpool, and Newcastle lie on the tidal rivers Thames, Mersey and Tyne, respectively. At 220 miles (350 km), the Severn is the longest river flowing through England. It empties into the Bristol Channel and is notable for its Severn Bore (a tidal bore), which can reach 2 metres (6.6 ft) in height. However, the longest river entirely in England is the Thames, which is 215 miles (346 km) in length. There are many lakes in England; the largest is Windermere, within the aptly named Lake District.

Most of England's landscape consists of low hills and plains, with upland and mountainous terrain in the north and west of the country. The northern uplands include the Pennines, a chain of uplands dividing east and west, the Lake District mountains in Cumbria, and the Cheviot Hills, straddling the border between England and Scotland. The highest point in England, at 978 metres (3,209 ft), is Scafell Pike in the Lake District. The Shropshire Hills are near Wales while Dartmoor and Exmoor are two upland areas in the south-west of the country. The approximate dividing line between terrain types is often indicated by the Tees–Exe line.

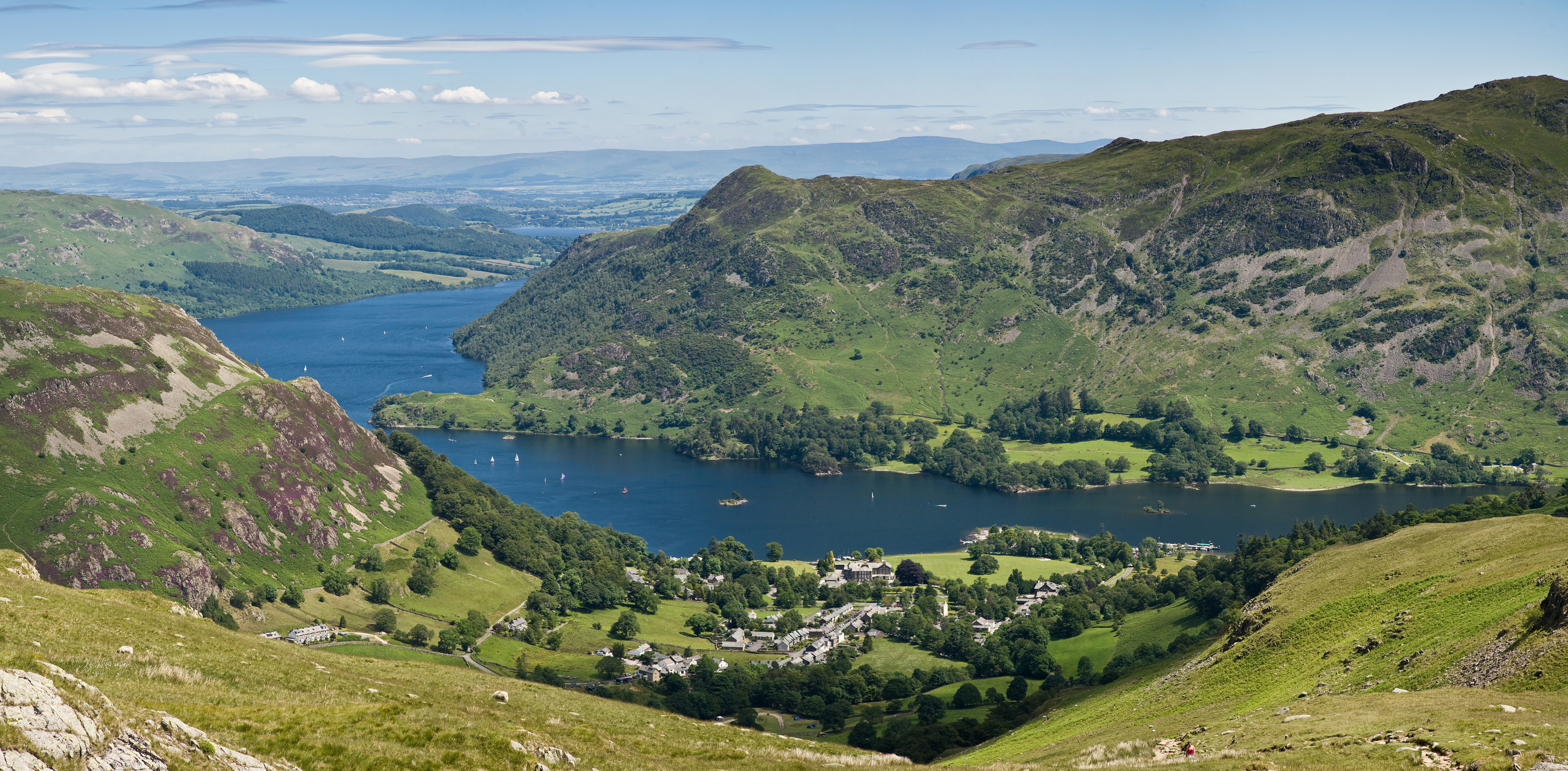
The village of Glenridding and Ullswater in Cumbria

The Pennines, known as the "backbone of England", are the oldest range of mountains in the country, originating from the end of the Paleozoic Era around 300 million years ago. The geological composition is predominantly sedimentary, featuring significant deposits of sandstone and limestone, alongside substantial coal seams. There are karst landscapes in calcite areas such as parts of Yorkshire and Derbyshire. The Pennine landscape is high moorland in upland areas, indented by fertile valleys of the region's rivers. They contain two national parks, the Yorkshire Dales and the Peak District. In the West Country, Dartmoor and Exmoor of the Southwest Peninsula include upland moorland supported by granite.

The English Lowlands are in the central and southern regions of the country, consisting of green rolling hills, including the Cotswold Hills, Chiltern Hills, North and South Downs; where they meet the sea they form white rock exposures such as the cliffs of Dover. The English Lowlands also include flat plains such as Salisbury Plain, the Somerset Levels, the South Coast Plain and The Fens.

=== Climate ===
England has a temperate maritime climate: it is mild with temperatures not much lower than 0 °C (32 °F) in winter and not much higher than 32 °C (90 °F) in summer. The weather is frequently damp and changeable. The coldest months are January and February, the latter particularly on the English coast, while July is normally the warmest. Months with mild to warm weather are May, June, September and October. Rainfall is spread fairly evenly throughout the year.

Important influences on the climate of England are its proximity to the Atlantic Ocean, its northern latitude and the warming of the sea by the Gulf Stream. Rainfall is higher in the west, and parts of the Lake District receive more rain than anywhere else in the country. Since weather records began, the highest temperature recorded was 40.3 °C (104.5 °F) on 19 July 2022 at Coningsby, Lincolnshire, while the lowest was −26.1 °C (−15.0 °F) on 10 January 1982 in Edgmond, Shropshire.

=== Nature and wildlife ===
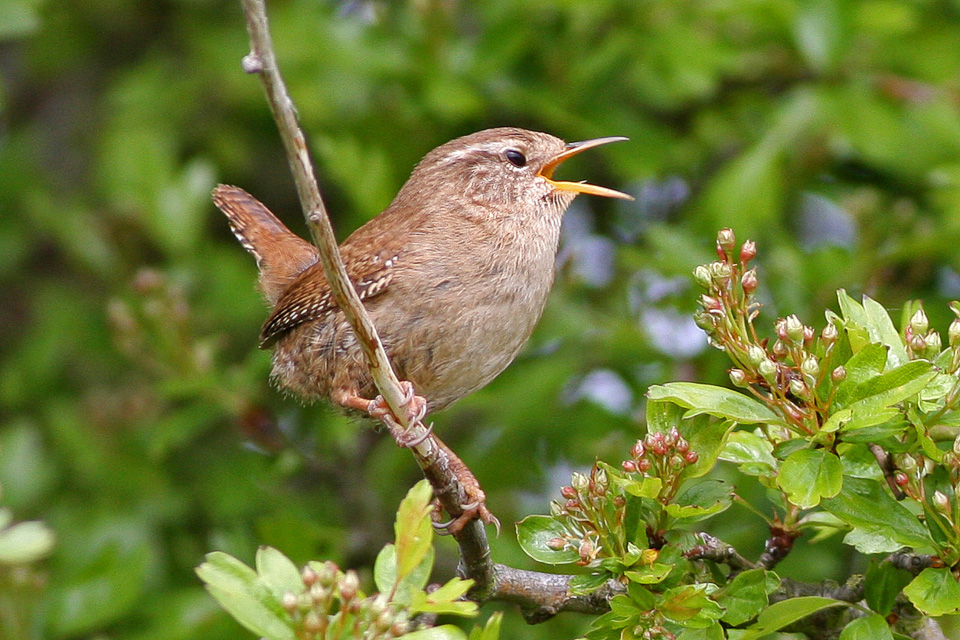
The Eurasian wren, the most numerous bird species in England

The fauna of England is similar to that of other areas in the British Isles with a wide range of vertebrate and invertebrate life in a diverse range of habitats. National nature reserves in England are designated by Natural England as key places for wildlife and natural features in England. They were established to protect the most significant areas of habitat and of geological formations. NNRs are managed on behalf of the nation, many by Natural England themselves, but also by non-governmental organisations, including the members of The Wildlife Trusts partnership, the National Trust, and the Royal Society for the Protection of Birds. There are 221 NNRs in England covering 110,000 hectares (1,100 square kilometres). Often they contain rare species or nationally important populations of plants and animals. The Environment Agency is a non-departmental public body, established in 1995 and sponsored by the Department for Environment, Food and Rural Affairs with responsibilities relating to the protection and enhancement of the environment in England. The secretary of state for environment, food and rural affairs is the minister responsible for environmental protection, agriculture, fisheries and rural communities in England.

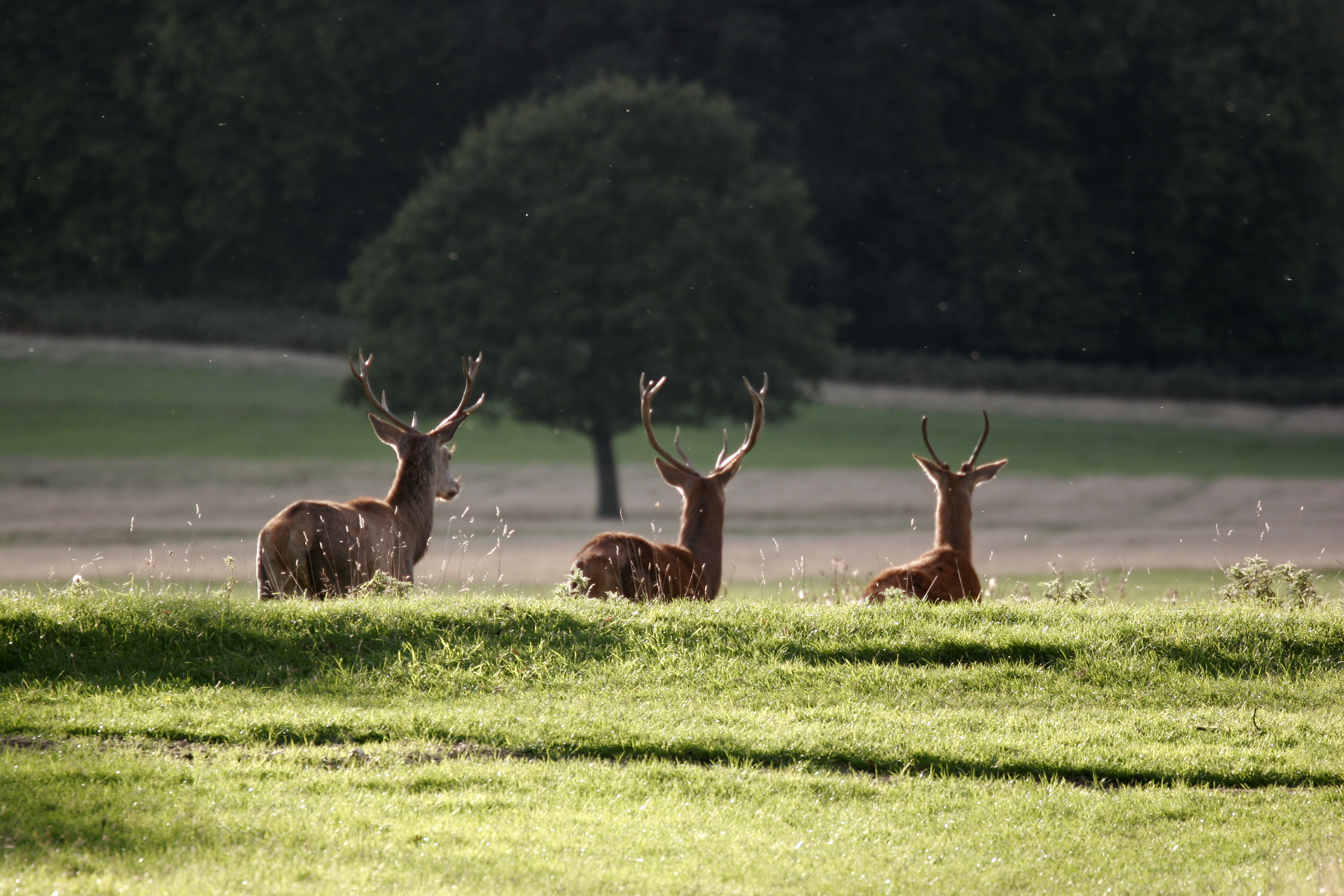
Red deer in Richmond Park. The park was created by Charles I in the 17th century as a deer park.

England has a temperate oceanic climate in most areas, lacking extremes of cold or heat, but does have a few small areas of subarctic and warmer areas in the South West. Towards the North of England the climate becomes colder and most of England's mountains and high hills are located here and have a major impact on the climate and thus the local fauna of the areas. Deciduous woodlands are common across all of England and provide a great habitat for much of England's wildlife, but these give way in northern and upland areas of England to coniferous forests (mainly plantations) which also benefit certain forms of wildlife. Some species have adapted to the expanded urban environment, particularly the red fox, which is the most successful urban mammal after the brown rat, and other animals such as the common wood pigeon, both of which thrive in urban and suburban areas. Despite the heavy urbanization of the nation, many mammals still persist in undeveloped regions such as European pine marten, Eurasian beaver, wild boar, European polecat, and Eurasian otter. Many species have however become extirpated during the nation's development including Eurasian lynx, gray wolf, brown bear, wild horse, and elk, with two species, the great auk and aurochs becoming completely extinct.

=== Major conurbations ===
The Greater London Built-up Area is by far the largest urban area in England and one of the busiest cities in the world. It is considered a global city and has a population larger than any other country in the United Kingdom besides England itself. Other urban areas of considerable size and influence tend to be in Northern England or the English Midlands. There are 50 settlements which have designated city status in England, while the wider United Kingdom has 66.

While many cities in England are quite large, such as Birmingham, Sheffield, Manchester, Liverpool, Leeds, Newcastle, Bradford, Nottingham, population size is not a prerequisite for city status. Traditionally the status was given to towns with diocesan cathedrals, so there are smaller cities like Wells, Ely, Ripon, Truro and Chichester.

== Economy ==
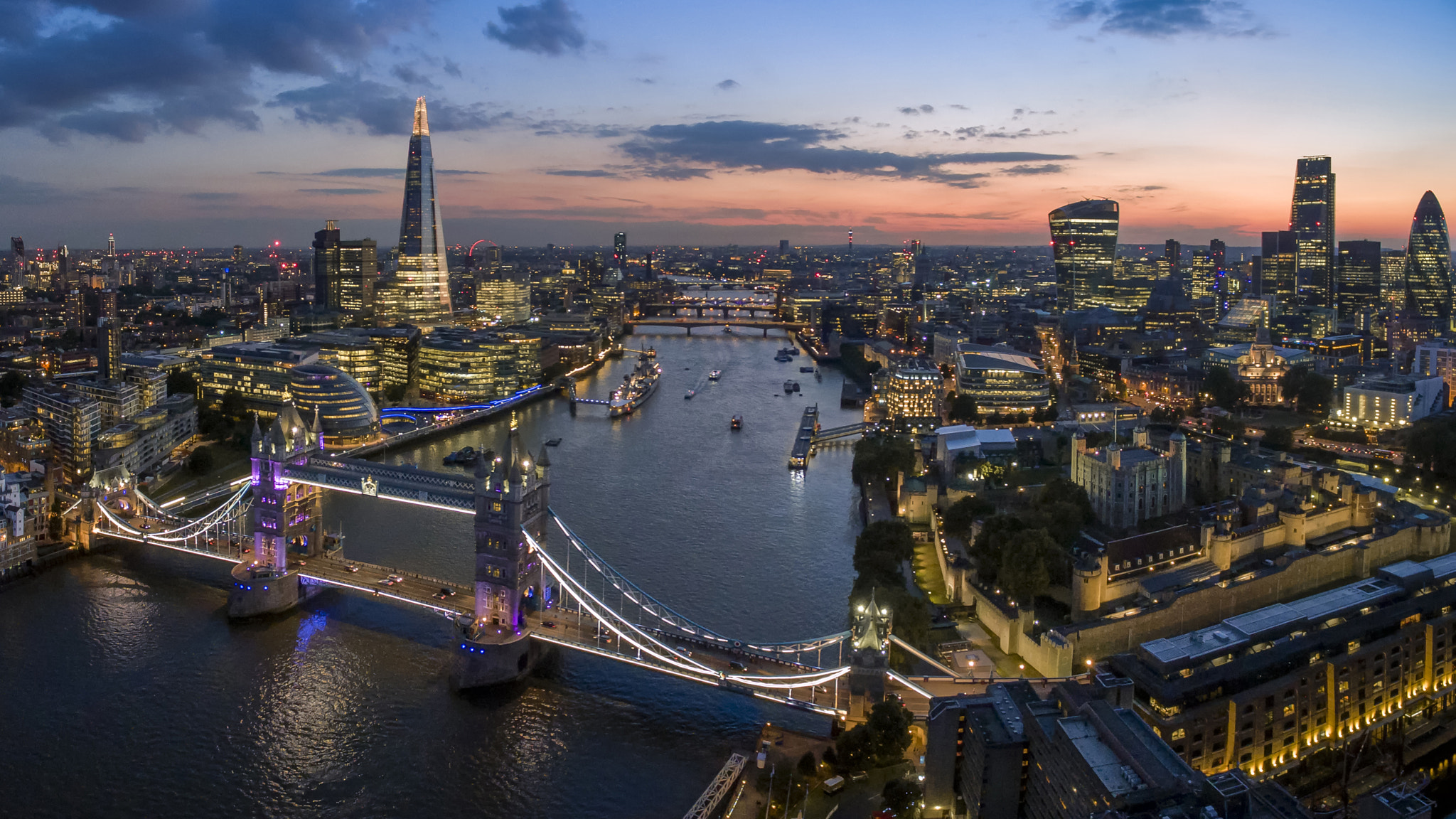
London is the financial capital of England and the United Kingdom.

England's economy is one of the largest and most dynamic in the world, with a GDP per capita of £37,852 in 2022. HM Treasury, led by the chancellor of the exchequer, is responsible for developing and executing the government's public finance policy and economic policy. Usually regarded as a mixed market economy, it has adopted many free market principles, yet maintains an advanced social welfare infrastructure.

The economy of England is the largest part of the UK's economy. England is a leader in the chemical and pharmaceutical sectors and in key technical industries, particularly aerospace, the arms industry, and the software industry. London, home to the London Stock Exchange, the United Kingdom's main stock exchange and the largest in Europe, is England's financial centre, with 100 of Europe's 500 largest corporations being based there. As of 2025, London is the largest financial centre in Europe and the second largest in the world.

London has been named as the fastest growing technology hub in Europe, with England having over 100 unique tech companies with a value of $1 billion or more. The Bank of England, founded in 1694 as private banker to the government of England and a state-owned institution since 1946, is the United Kingdom's central bank. The bank has a monopoly on the issue of banknotes in England and Wales, although not in other parts of the UK. The government has devolved responsibility to the bank's Monetary Policy Committee for managing the monetary policy of the country and setting interest rates.

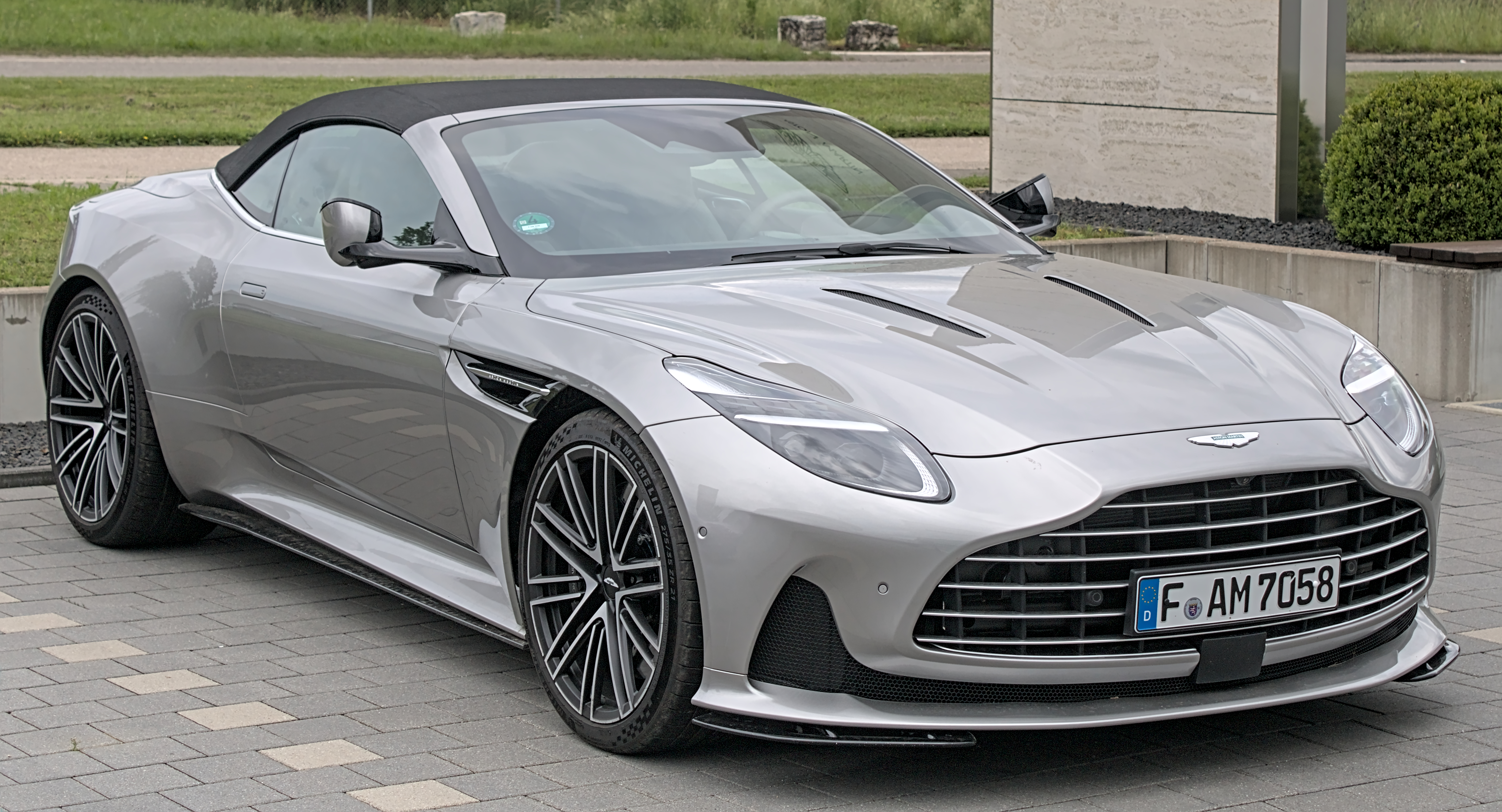
Aston Martin manufacture luxury vehicles in England.

England is highly industrialised, but since the 1970s there has been a decline in traditional heavy and manufacturing industries, and an increasing emphasis on a more service industry-oriented economy. Tourism has become a significant industry, attracting millions of visitors to England each year. The export part of the economy is dominated by pharmaceuticals, automotives, crude oil and petroleum from the English parts of North Sea oil along with Wytch Farm, aircraft engines and alcoholic beverages. The creative industries accounted for 7 per cent GVA in 2005 and grew at an average of 6 per cent per annum between 1997 and 2005.

Agriculture is intensive, highly mechanised and efficient by European standards, producing 60% of food needs with only 2% of the labour force. Two-thirds of production is devoted to livestock, the remainder to arable crops. The main crops that are grown are wheat, barley, oats, potatoes, and sugar beets. England retains a significant fishing industry. Its fleets bring home a variety of fish, ranging from sole to herring. England is also rich in natural resources including coal, petroleum, natural gas, tin, limestone, iron ore, salt, clay, chalk, gypsum, lead, and silica.

=== Science and technology ===
Prominent English figures from the field of science and mathematics include Sir Isaac Newton, Charles Darwin, Robert Hooke, Alan Turing, Stephen Hawking, Edward Jenner, Francis Crick, Joseph Lister, Joseph Priestley, Thomas Young, Christopher Wren and Richard Dawkins.

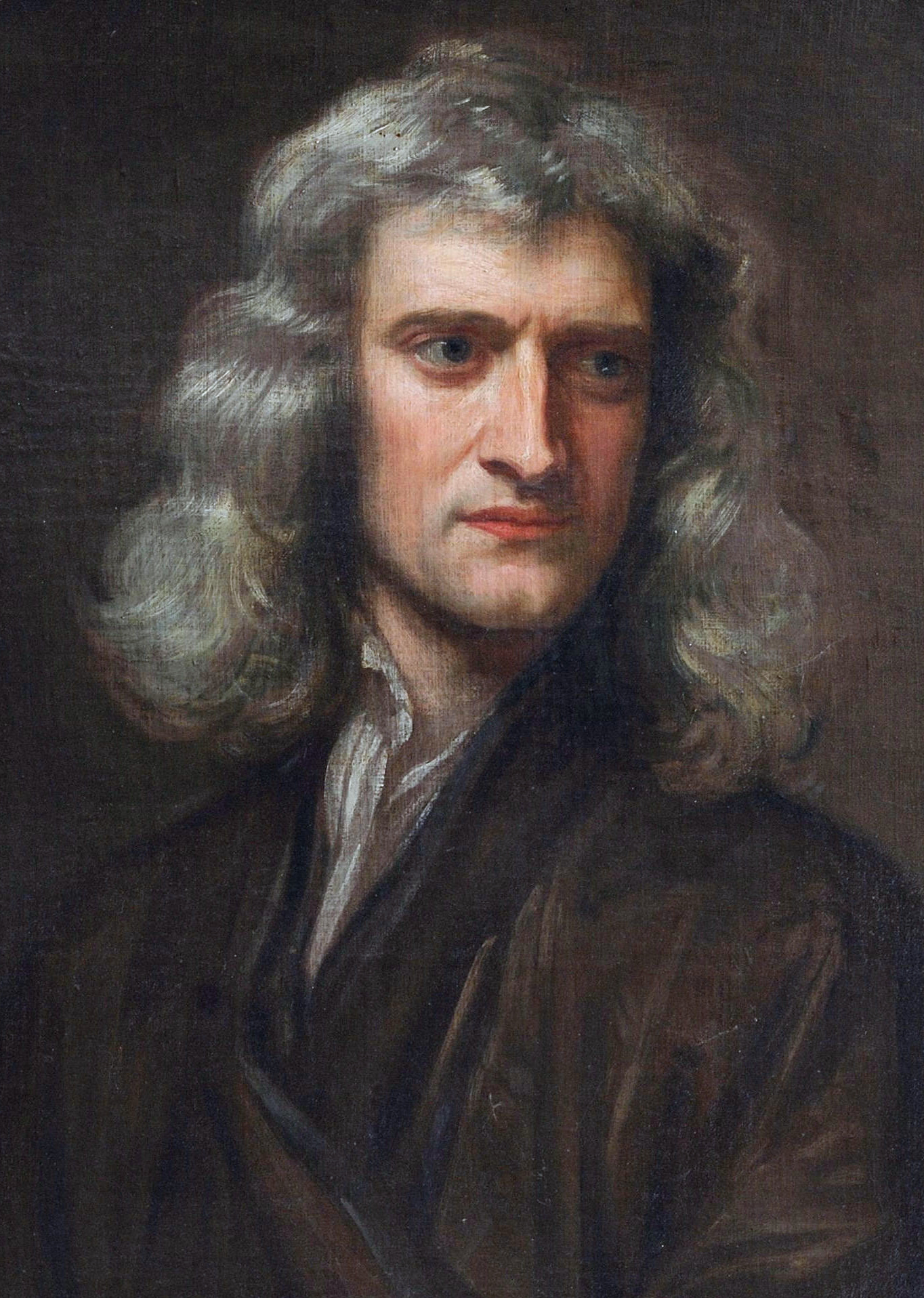
Sir Isaac Newton is one of the most influential figures in the history of science.

England was a leading centre of the Scientific Revolution from the 17th century. As the birthplace of the Industrial Revolution, England was home to many significant inventors during the late 18th and early 19th centuries. Famous English engineers include Isambard Kingdom Brunel, best known for the creation of the Great Western Railway, a series of famous steamships, and numerous important bridges, revolutionising public transport and modern-day engineering. Thomas Newcomen's steam engine helped spawn the Industrial Revolution.

The Father of Railways, George Stephenson, built the first public inter-city railway line in the world, the Liverpool and Manchester Railway, which opened in 1830. With his role in the marketing and manufacturing of the steam engine, and invention of modern coinage, Matthew Boulton (business partner of James Watt) is regarded as one of the most influential entrepreneurs in history. The physician Edward Jenner's smallpox vaccine is said to have "saved more lives ... than were lost in all the wars of mankind since the beginning of recorded history."

Inventions and discoveries of the English include the jet engine; the first industrial spinning machine; the first computer and the first modern computer; the World Wide Web along with HTML; the first successful human blood transfusion; the motorised vacuum cleaner; the lawn mower; the seat belt; the hovercraft; the electric motor; steam engines; and theories such as the Darwinian theory of evolution and atomic theory. Newton developed the ideas of universal gravitation, Newtonian mechanics, and calculus, and Robert Hooke his eponymously named law of elasticity. Other inventions include the iron plate railway, the thermosiphon, tarmac, the rubber band, the mousetrap, "cat's eye" road marker, joint development of the light bulb, steam locomotives, the modern seed drill and many modern techniques and technologies used in precision engineering.

English innovators made crucial contributions to computing from the earliest concepts to the microchip era. Charles Babbage and Ada Lovelace conceived the first programmable computer, while George Boole created the binary logic underlying all digital systems, known as boolean logic. Alan Turing defined the foundations of computing and pioneered artificial intelligence, while Tommy Flowers built Colossus, proving electronic computing feasible. Sir Frederic Williams, Tom Kilburn and Geoff Tootill developed the Manchester Baby, while Sir Maurice Wilkes developed EDSAC contributing to the first stored-program computers that established modern computer architecture. Geoffrey Dummer conceptualised the integrated circuit.

The Royal Society, formally The Royal Society of London for Improving Natural Knowledge, is a learned society and the United Kingdom's national academy of sciences. Founded on 28 November 1660, it is the oldest national scientific institution in the world. The Royal Institution of Great Britain was founded in 1799 by leading English scientists, including Henry Cavendish. Some experts claim that the earliest concept of a metric system was invented by John Wilkins in 1668.

Scientific research and development remains important in the universities of England, with many establishing science parks to facilitate production and co-operation with industry. Cambridge is the most intensive research cluster for science and technology in the world. In 2022, the UK produced 6.3 per cent of the world's scientific research papers and had a 10.5 per cent share of scientific citations, the third highest in the world (after the United States and China). Scientific journals produced in England include Nature, the British Medical Journal and The Lancet. The Department for Science, Innovation and Technology, secretary of state for science, innovation and technology, and minister of state for science, research and innovation has responsibility for science in England.

=== Transport ===
The Department for Transport is the government body responsible for overseeing transport in England. The department is run by the secretary of state for transport.

England has a dense and modern transportation infrastructure. There are many motorways in England, and many other trunk roads, such as the A1 Great North Road, which runs through eastern England from London to Newcastle (much of this section is motorway) and onward to the Scottish border. The longest motorway in England is the M6, from Rugby through the North West up to the Anglo-Scottish border, a distance of 232 miles (373 km). Other major routes include: the M1 from London to Leeds, the M25 which encircles London, the M60 which encircles Manchester, the M4 from London to South Wales, the M62 from Liverpool via Manchester to East Yorkshire, and the M5 from Birmingham to Bristol and the South West.

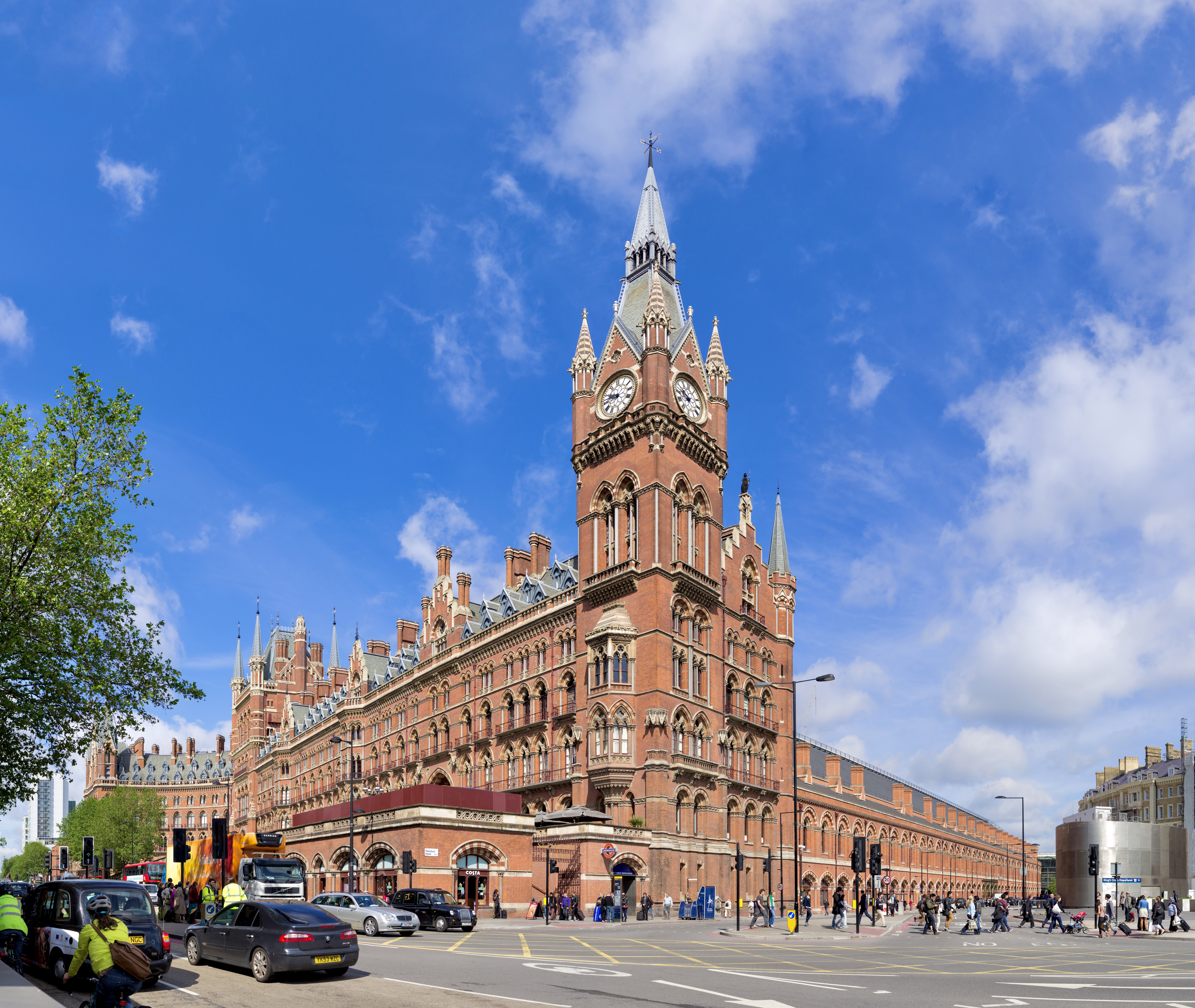
London St Pancras International is one of London's main domestic and international transport hubs providing both commuter rail and high-speed rail services across the UK and to Paris, Lille and Brussels.

Bus transport across the country is widespread; major companies include Arriva, FirstGroup, Go-Ahead Group, Mobico Group, Rotala and Stagecoach Group. Bus rapid transit originated in England with the Runcorn Busway opening in 1971. The red double-decker buses in London have become a symbol of England. National Cycle Route offers cycling routes nationally.

Rail transport in England is the oldest in the world: passenger railways originated in England in 1825. Much of Britain's 10,000 miles (16,000 km) of rail network lies in England, covering the country fairly extensively. There is rail access to France and Belgium through the Channel Tunnel (completed in 1994) with Eurostar or LeShuttle services.

Great British Railways is a planned state-owned public body that will oversee rail transport in Great Britain from 2024. The Office of Rail and Road is responsible for the economic and safety regulation of England's railways. Crossrail was Europe's largest construction project with a £15 billion projected cost, opened in 2022. High Speed 2, a high-speed north–south railway line, is under construction since 2019.

There is a rapid transit network in two English cities: the London Underground, and the Tyne and Wear Metro in Newcastle upon Tyne, Gateshead and Sunderland. There are several extensive tram networks, such as the Manchester Metrolink, Sheffield Supertram, West Midlands Metro, Nottingham Express Transit, and Tramlink in South London. England also has extensive domestic and international aviation links. The largest airport is Heathrow, which is the world's second busiest airport measured by number of international passengers.

By sea there is ferry transport, both local and international, including from Liverpool to Ireland and the Isle of Man, and Hull to the Netherlands and Belgium. There are around 4,400 miles (7,100 km) of navigable waterways in England, half of which is owned by the Canal & River Trust, however, water transport is very limited. The River Thames is the major waterway in England, with imports and exports focused at the Port of Tilbury in the Thames Estuary, one of the United Kingdom's three major ports.

=== Energy ===
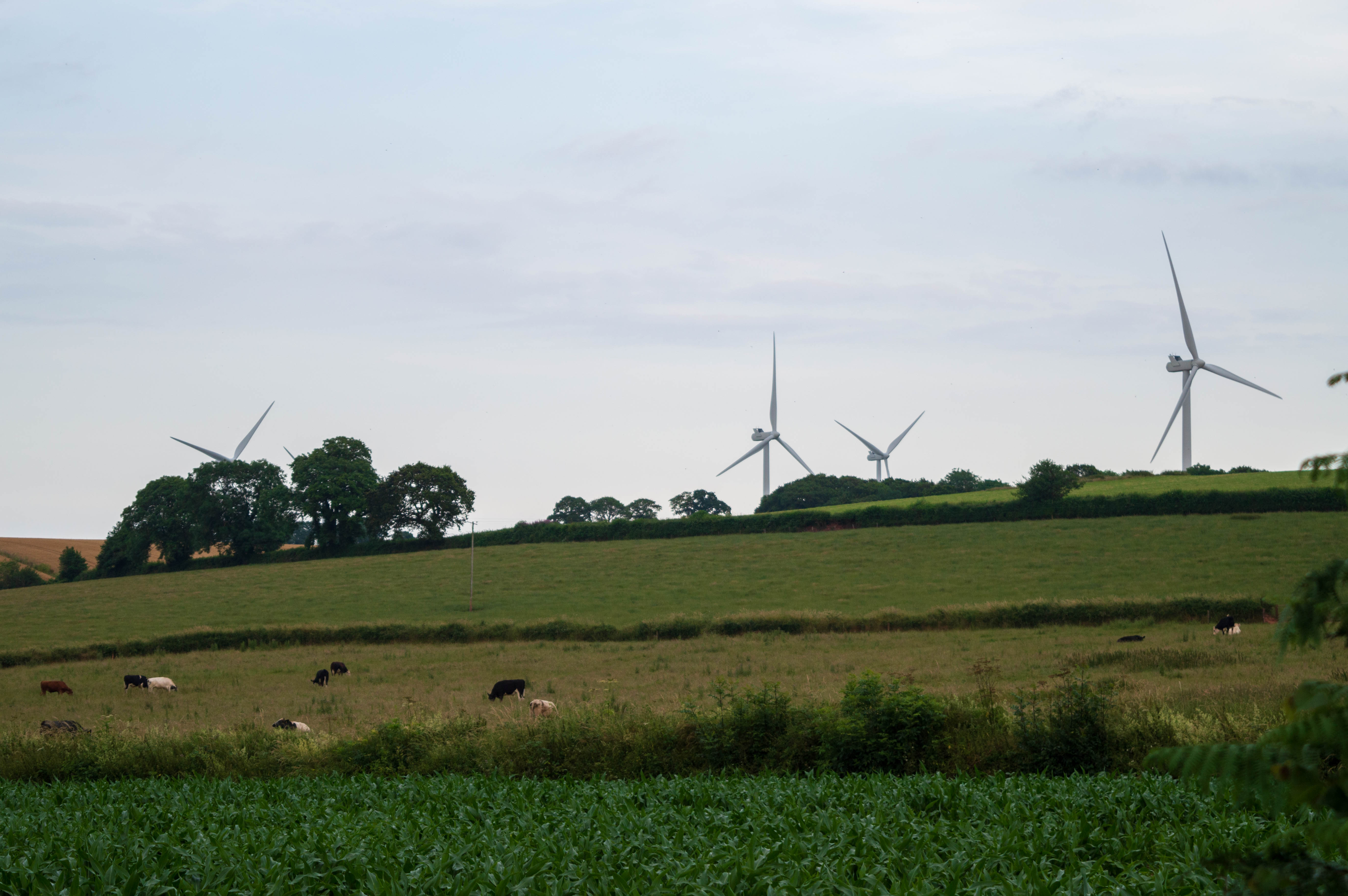
Wind turbines at Den Brook, Devon. The UK is one of the best sites in Europe for wind energy, and wind power production is its fastest growing supply.

Successive governments have outlined numerous commitments to reduce carbon dioxide emissions. Notably, the UK is one of the best sites in Europe for wind energy, and wind power production is its fastest growing supply. Wind power contributed 26.8% of UK electricity generation in 2022. England is home to Hornsea 2, the largest offshore wind farm in the world, situated in waters roughly 89 kilometres off the coast of Yorkshire.

The Climate Change Act 2008 was passed in Parliament with an overwhelming majority across political parties. It sets out emission reduction targets that the UK must comply with legally. It represents the first global legally binding climate change mitigation target set by a country. UK government energy policy aims to play a key role in limiting greenhouse gas emissions, while meeting energy demand. Shifting availabilities of resources and development of technologies also change the country's energy mix through changes in costs.

The current energy policy is the responsibility of the Department for Energy Security and Net Zero and secretary of state for energy sucurity and net zero. The minister of state for business, energy and clean growth is responsible for green finance, climate science and innovation, and low carbon generation. In 2024, the United Kingdom was ranked 5 out of 180 countries in the Environmental Performance Index. A law has been passed that UK greenhouse gas emissions will be net zero by 2050.

== Healthcare ==
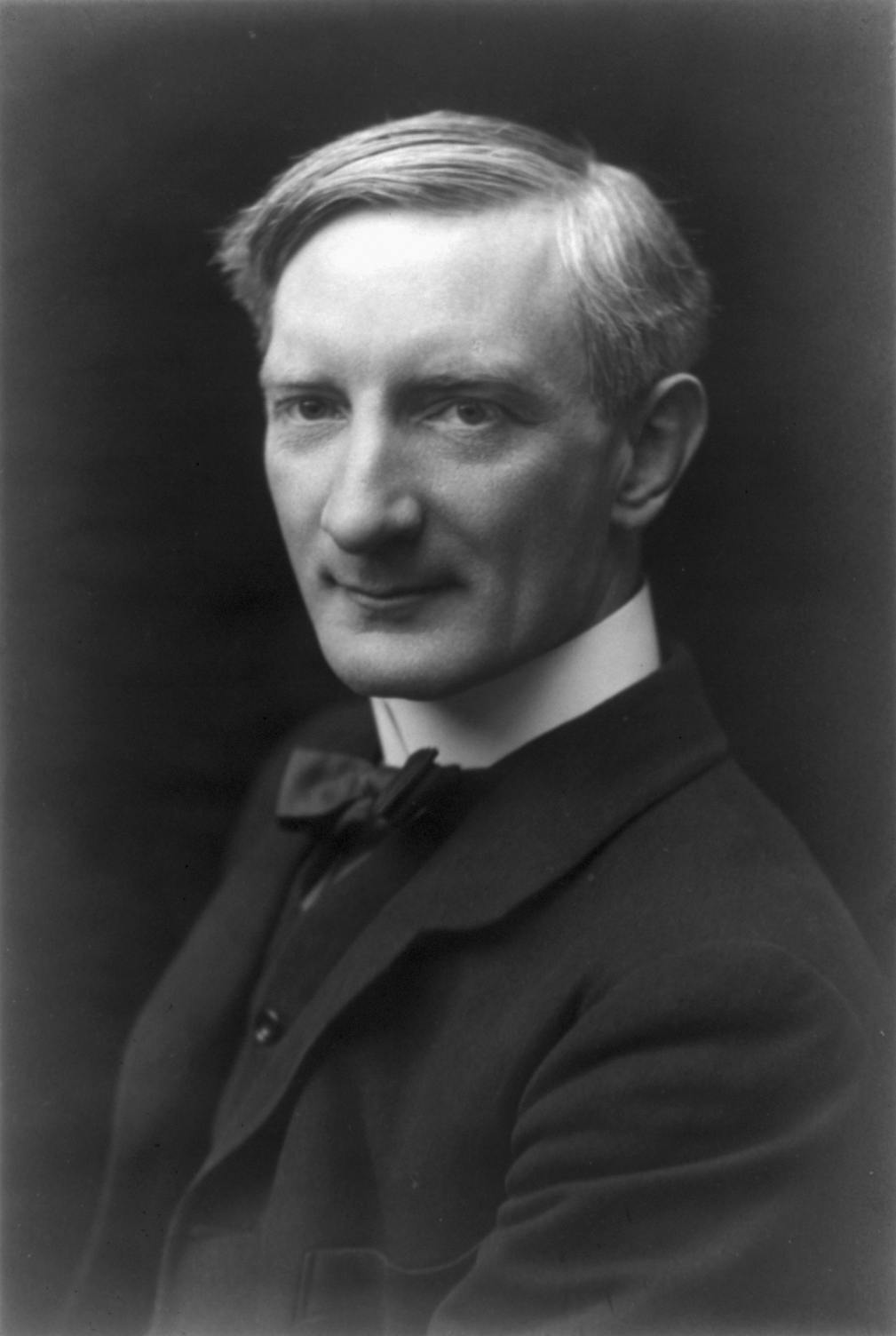
William Beveridge's 1942 report Social Insurance and Allied Services served as the basis for the post-World War II welfare state.

The National Health Service (NHS) is the publicly funded healthcare system responsible for providing the majority of healthcare in the country. The NHS began on 5 July 1948, putting into effect the provisions of the National Health Service Act 1946. It was based on the findings of the Beveridge Report, prepared by the economist and social reformer, William Beveridge. The NHS is largely funded by general taxation and National Insurance payments; it provides most of its services free at the point of use, although there are charges for some people for eye tests, dental care, prescriptions and aspects of personal care.

The government department responsible for the NHS is the Department of Health, under the secretary of state for health. Most of the department's expenses are on the NHS – £98.6 billion was spent in 2008–2009. Regulatory bodies such as the General Medical Council and the Nursing and Midwifery Council are organised on a UK-wide basis, as are non-governmental bodies such as the Royal Colleges.

The average life expectancy is 77.5 years for males and 81.7 years for females, the highest of the four countries of the United Kingdom. The south of England has a higher life expectancy than the north, but regional differences seem to be slowly narrowing: between 1991–1993 and 2012–2014, life expectancy in the North East increased by 6.0 years and in the North West by 5.8 years.

== Demographics ==
=== Population ===
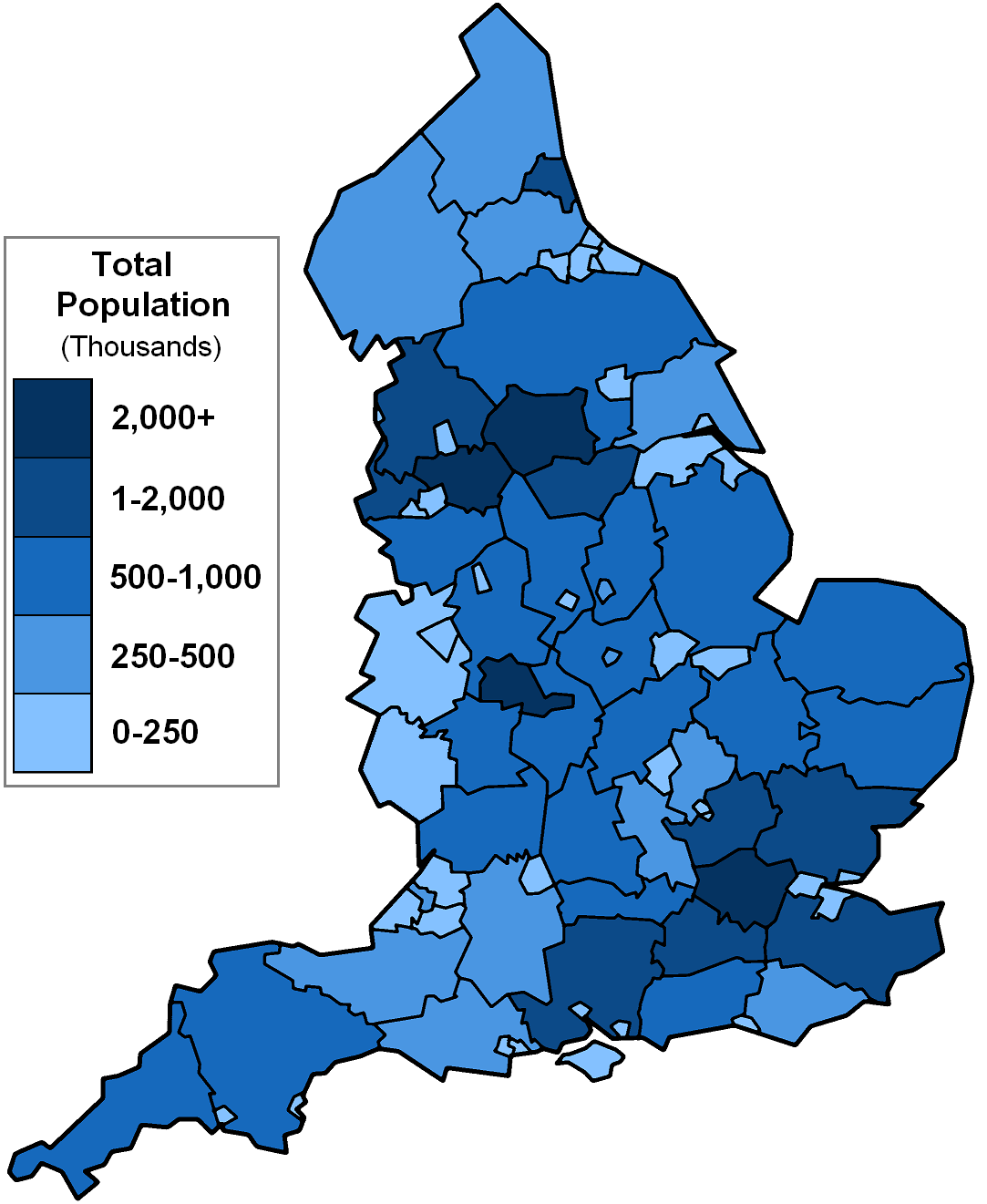
The metropolitan and non-metropolitan counties, colour-coded to show population

Population of England and Wales by administrative areas. Their size shows their population, with some approximation. Each group of squares in the map key is 20% of total number of districts.

With over 56 million inhabitants, England is the most populous country of the United Kingdom, accounting for 84% of the combined total. England taken as a unit and measured against international states would be the 26th largest country by population in the world.

The English people are British people. There is an English diaspora in former parts of the British Empire; especially the United States, Canada, Australia, South Africa and New Zealand. (Note: For instance, in 1980 around 50 million Americans claimed English ancestry. In Canada there are around 6.5 million Canadians who claim English ancestry. Around 70% of Australians in 1999 denoted their origins as Anglo-Celtic, a category which includes all peoples from Great Britain and Ireland. Chileans of English descent are somewhat of an anomaly in that Chile itself was never part of the British Empire, but today there are around 420,000 people of English origins living there.) Since the late 1990s, many English people have migrated to Spain. Due in particular to the economic prosperity of South East England, it has received many economic migrants from the other parts of the United Kingdom. There has been significant Irish migration. The proportion of ethnically European residents totals at 81.7%, including White British, Germans and Poles, down from 94.1% in 1991. Other people from much further afield in the former British colonies have arrived since the 1950s: in particular, about 7% of people living in England have family origins in the Indian subcontinent, mostly India, Pakistan and Bangladesh. About 0.7% are Chinese, 0.6% are Arabs. 4.0% of the population are black, from Africa and the Caribbean, especially former British colonies, and 2.9% identified as multiracial or mixed.

In 2007, 22% of primary school children in England were from ethnic minority families, and in 2011 that figure was 26.5%. About half of the population increase between 1991 and 2001 was due to immigration.

England contains one indigenous national minority, the Cornish people, recognised by the UK government under the Framework Convention for the Protection of National Minorities in 2014.

=== Language ===
Language	Native speakers (thousands)
English	46,937
Polish	529
Punjabi	272
Urdu	266
Bengali	216
Gujarati	212
Arabic	152
French	145
Portuguese	131
Welsh	8
Cornish	0.6
Other	2,267
Population	51,006

English, today widely spoken around the world, originated in what is now England, where it remains the principal tongue. According to a 2011 census, it is spoken well or very well by 98% of the population

English language learning and teaching is an important economic activity. There is no legislation mandating an official language for England, but English is the only language used for official business. Despite the country's relatively small size, there are many distinct regional accents.

Cornish died out as a community language in the 18th century but is being revived, and is now protected under the European Charter for Regional or Minority Languages. It is spoken by 0.1% of people in Cornwall, and is taught to some degree in several primary and secondary schools.

State schools teach students a second language or third language from the ages of seven, most commonly French, Spanish or German. It was reported in 2007 that around 800,000 school students spoke a foreign language at home, the most common being Punjabi and Urdu. However, following the 2011 census data released by the Office for National Statistics, figures now show that Polish is the main language spoken in England after English. In 2022, British Sign Language became an official language of England when the British Sign Language Act 2022 came into effect.

=== Religion ===
In the 2021 census, 46.3% of the population of England specified their religion as Christian, 36.7% answered that they had no religion, 6.7% specified that they were Muslim, while 4.3% of the population belongs to other religions and 6% did not give an answer. Christianity is the most widely practised religion in England. The established church of England is the Church of England, which left communion with Rome in the 1530s when Henry VIII was unable to annul his marriage to Catherine of Aragon. The church regards itself as both Catholic and Protestant.

There are High Church and Low Church traditions, and some Anglicans regard themselves as Anglo-Catholics, following the Tractarian movement. The monarch of the United Kingdom is the supreme governor of the Church of England, which has around 26 million baptised members (of whom the vast majority are not regular churchgoers). In 2016, research at St. Mary's University in London reported that 19.8% of the population of England and Wales identified as Anglican. The Church of England forms part of the Anglican Communion, with the Archbishop of Canterbury acting as its symbolic worldwide head. Many cathedrals and parish churches are historic buildings of significant architectural importance, such as Westminster Abbey, York Minster, Durham Cathedral, and Salisbury Cathedral.

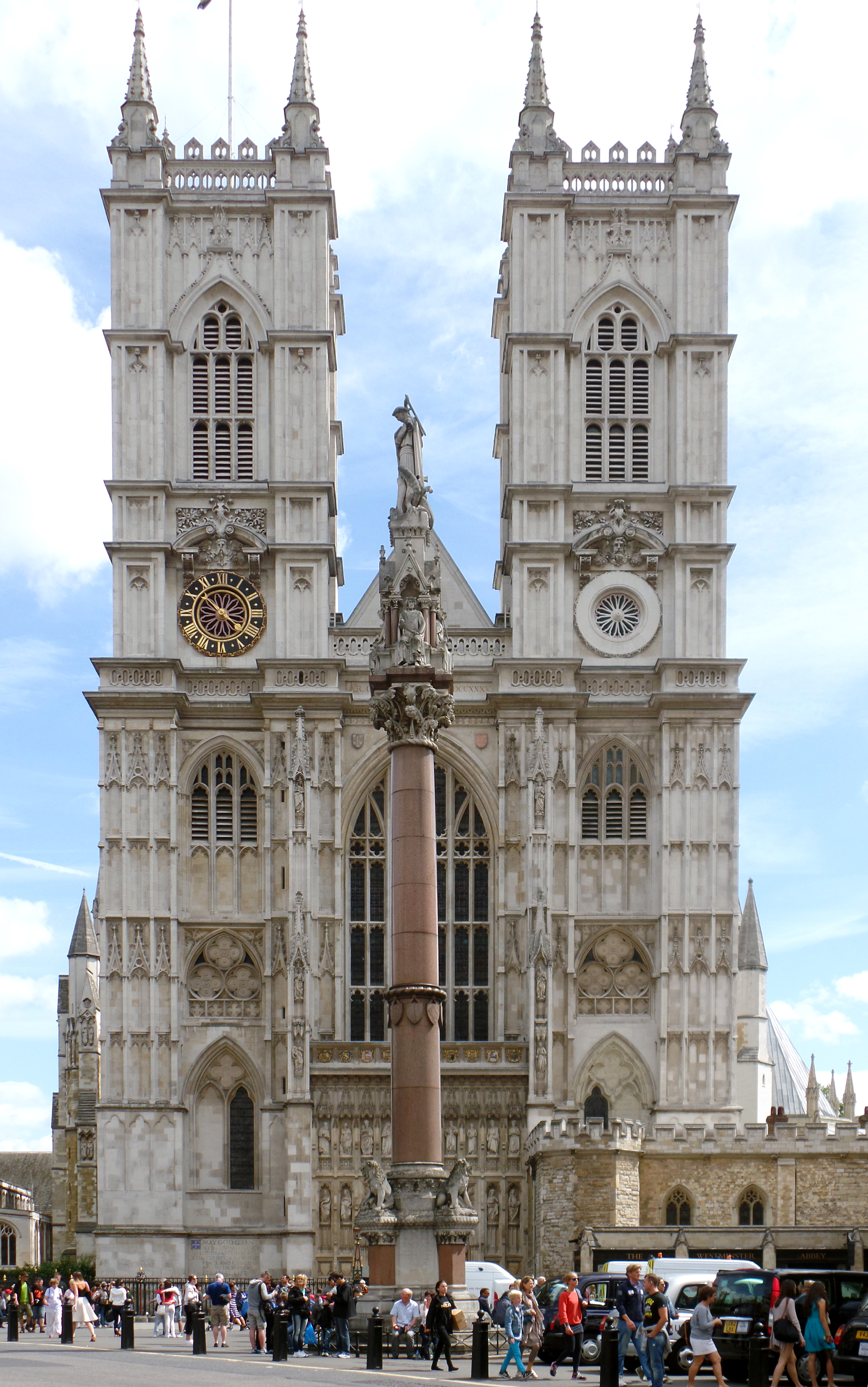
Westminster Abbey is a notable example of English Gothic architecture. The coronation of the British monarch traditionally takes place at the Abbey.

The second-largest Christian denomination is the Catholic Church. Since its reintroduction after the Catholic Emancipation, the Church has organised ecclesiastically on an England and Wales basis where there are 4.5 million members (most of whom are English). In 2016, 8.3% of the population of England and Wales identified as Catholic. There has been one Pope from England to date, Adrian IV, while saints Bede, Anselm, and John Henry Newman are regarded as Doctors of the Church.

A form of Protestantism known as Methodism is the third largest Christian practice; it grew out of Anglicanism through John Wesley. It gained popularity in the mill towns of Lancashire and Yorkshire, and amongst tin miners in Cornwall. There are other nonconformist minorities, such as Baptists, Quakers, Congregationalists, Unitarians and The Salvation Army.

The patron saint of England is Saint George; his symbolic cross is included in the flag of England. There are many other English and associated saints, including Cuthbert, Edmund, Alban, Wilfrid, Aidan, Edward the Confessor, John Fisher, Thomas More, Petroc, Piran, Margaret Clitherow and Thomas Becket. There are non-Christian religions practised. Jews have a history of a small minority on the island since 1070. They were expelled from England in 1290 following the Edict of Expulsion, and were allowed back in 1656.

Especially since the 1950s, religions from the former British colonies have grown in numbers, due to immigration. Islam is the most common of these, now accounting for around 5% of the population in England. Hinduism, Sikhism and Buddhism are next in number, adding up to 2.8% combined, introduced from India and Southeast Asia.

A small minority of the population practise ancient Pagan religions. Neopaganism in the United Kingdom is primarily represented by Wicca and Neopagan witchcraft, Druidry, and Heathenry. According to the 2011 census, there are roughly 53,172 people who identify as Pagan in England, (Note: People who strictly identified as "Pagan". Other Pagan paths, such as Wicca or Druidism, have not been included in this number.) including 11,026 Wiccans. (Note: People who strictly identified as "Wiccan". Other Pagan paths, such as Druidism, and general "Pagan" have not been included in this number.) 24.7% of people in England declared no religion, compared with 14.6% in 2001. Norwich had the highest such proportion at 42.5%, followed by Brighton and Hove at 42.4%.

== Education ==
The Department for Education is the government department responsible for issues affecting people in England up to the age of 19, including education. State-funded schools are attended by about 93% of English schoolchildren. Education is the responsibility of the secretary of state for education.

Children between the ages of 3 and 5 attend nursery or an Early Years Foundation Stage reception unit within a primary school. Children between the ages of 5 and 11 attend primary school, and secondary school is attended by those aged between 11 and 16. State-funded schools are obliged by law to teach the National Curriculum; basic areas of learning include English literature, English language, mathematics, science, art & design, citizenship, history, geography, religious education, design & technology, computing, ancient & modern languages, music, and physical education.

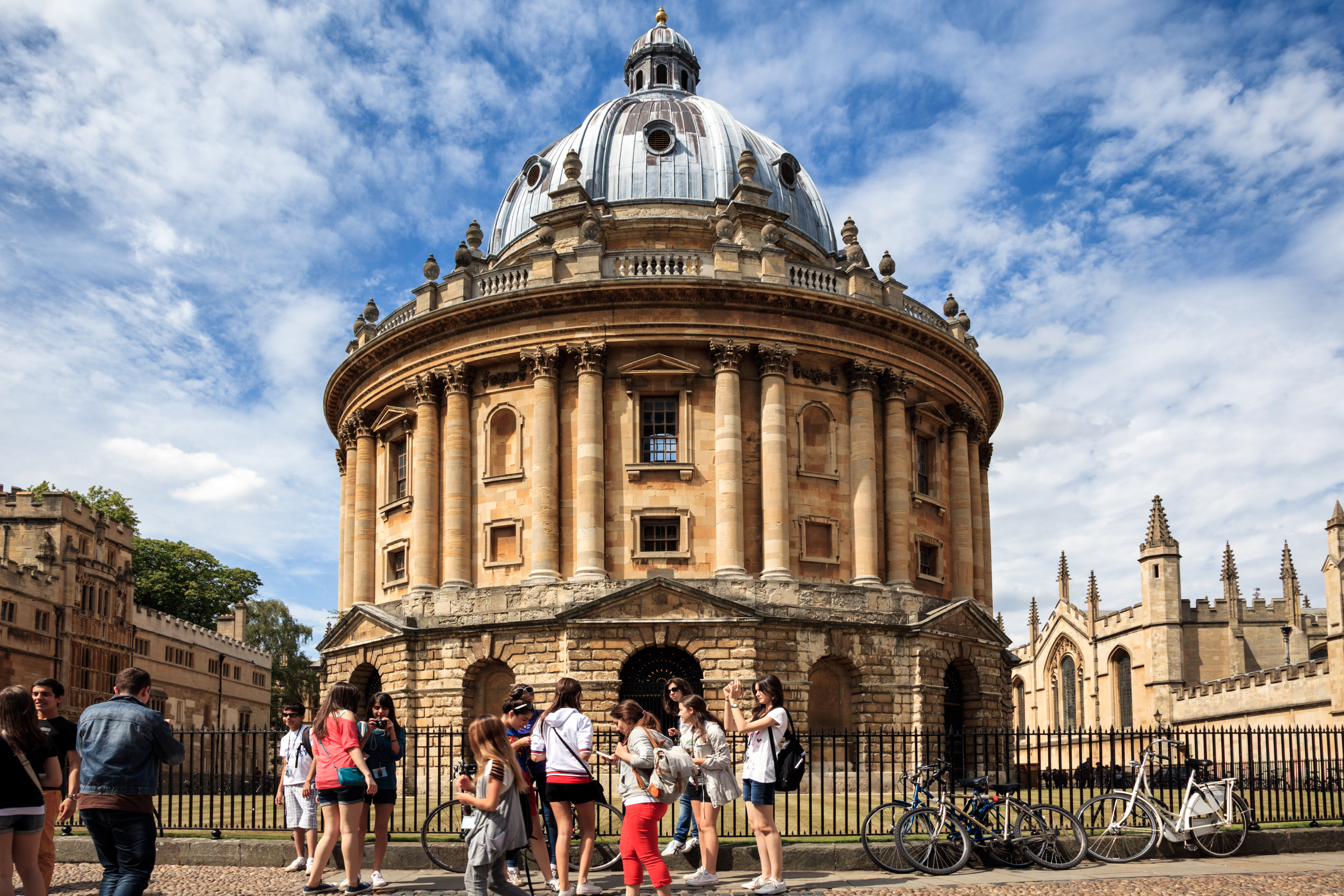
The University of Oxford was founded in 1096, making it the world's second-oldest university.

The Programme for International Student Assessment coordinated by the OECD currently ranks the overall knowledge and skills of British 15-year-olds as 13th in the world in literacy, mathematics, and science with the average British student scoring 503.7, well above the OECD average of 493.

Although most English secondary schools are comprehensive, there are selective intake grammar schools to which entrance is subject to passing the eleven-plus exam. Around 7.2 per cent of English schoolchildren attend private schools, which are funded by private sources. There are also widespread state faith schools. Standards in state schools are monitored by the Office for Standards in Education, and in private schools by the Independent Schools Inspectorate.

After finishing compulsory education, students take GCSE examinations. Students may then opt to continue into further education for two years. Further education colleges (particularly sixth form colleges) often form part of a secondary school site. A-level examinations are sat by a large number of further education students, and often form the basis of an application to university. Further education covers a wide curriculum of study and apprenticeships, including T-levels, BTEC, NVQ and others. Tertiary colleges provide both academic and vocational courses.

=== Higher education ===
Higher education students normally attend university from age 18 onwards, where they study for an academic degree. There are over 90 universities in England, all but one of which are public institutions. The Department for Business, Innovation and Skills is the government department responsible for higher education in England. Students are generally entitled to student loans to cover tuition fees and living costs. (Note: Students attending English universities now have to pay tuition fees towards the cost of their education, as do English students who choose to attend university in Scotland. Scottish students attending Scottish universities have their fees paid by the devolved Scottish Parliament.) The first degree offered to undergraduates is the bachelor's degree, which usually takes three years to complete. Students are then able to work towards a postgraduate degree, which usually takes one year, or a doctorate, which takes three or more years.

England's universities include some of the highest-ranked universities in the world. As of 2024, four England-based universities, the University of Cambridge, University of Oxford, Imperial College London, and University College London, are ranked amongst the top ten in the 2024 QS World University Rankings. The University of Cambridge, founded in 1209, and the University of Oxford, founded in 1096, are the two oldest universities in the English-speaking world.

The London School of Economics has been described as the world's leading social science institution for both teaching and research. The London Business School is considered one of the world's leading business schools and in 2010 its MBA programme was ranked best in the world by the Financial Times. Academic degrees in England are usually split into classes: first class, upper second class, lower second class, third, and unclassified. The King's School, Canterbury and King's School, Rochester are the oldest schools in the English-speaking world. Many of England's most well-known schools, such as Winchester College, Eton, St Paul's School, Harrow School and Rugby School are fee-paying institutions.

== Culture ==
=== Architecture ===
Many ancient standing stone monuments were erected during the prehistoric period; amongst the best known are Stonehenge, Devil's Arrows, Rudston Monolith and Castlerigg. With the introduction of Ancient Roman architecture there was a development of basilicas, baths, amphitheaters, triumphal arches, villas, Roman temples, Roman roads, Roman forts, stockades and aqueducts. It was the Romans who founded the first cities and towns such as London, Bath, York, Chester and St Albans. Perhaps the best-known example is Hadrian's Wall stretching right across northern England. Another well-preserved example is the Roman Baths at Bath, Somerset.

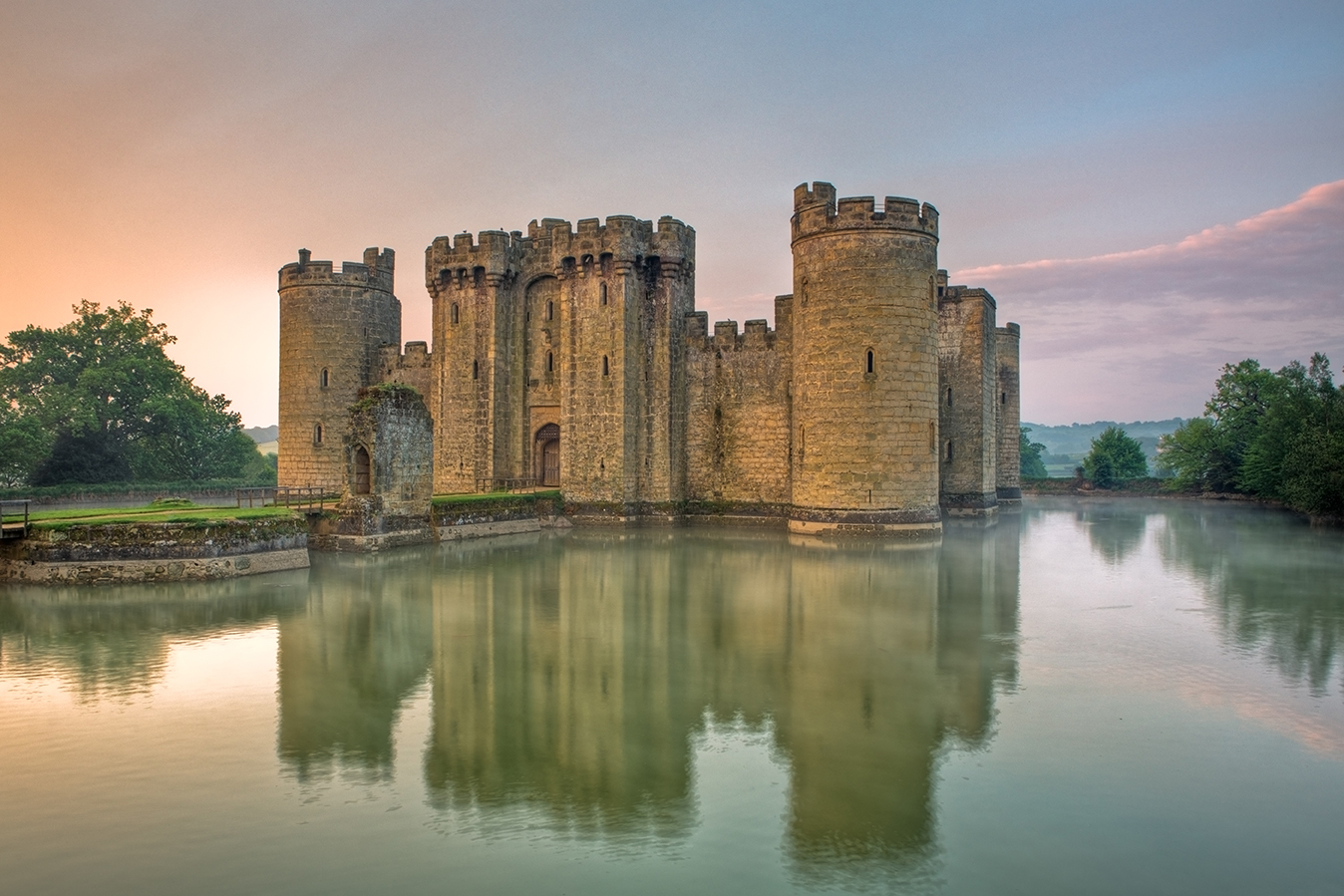
Bodiam Castle is a 14th-century moated castle near Robertsbridge in East Sussex.

Early medieval architecture's secular buildings were simple constructions mainly using timber with thatch for roofing. Ecclesiastical architecture ranged from a synthesis of Hiberno–Saxon monasticism, to Early Christian basilica and architecture characterised by pilaster-strips, blank arcading, baluster shafts and triangular headed openings. After the Norman conquest in 1066 various castles were created; the best known include the Tower of London, Warwick Castle, Durham Castle and Windsor Castle.

Throughout the Plantagenet era, an English Gothic architecture flourished, with prime examples including the medieval cathedrals such as Canterbury Cathedral, Westminster Abbey and York Minster. Expanding on the Norman base there was also castles, palaces, great houses, universities and parish churches. Medieval architecture was completed with the 16th-century Tudor style; the four-centred arch, now known as the Tudor arch, was a defining feature as were wattle and daub houses domestically. In the aftermath of the Renaissance a form of architecture echoing classical antiquity synthesised with Christianity appeared, the English Baroque style of architect Christopher Wren being particularly championed.

Georgian architecture followed in a more refined style, evoking a simple Palladian form; the Royal Crescent at Bath is one of the best examples of this. With the emergence of romanticism during Victorian period, a Gothic Revival was launched. In addition to this, around the same time the Industrial Revolution paved the way for buildings such as The Crystal Palace. Since the 1930s various modernist forms have appeared whose reception is often controversial, though traditionalist resistance movements continue with support in influential places. (Note: While people such as Norman Foster and Richard Rogers represent the modernist movement, Prince Charles since the 1980s has voiced strong views against it in favour of traditional architecture and put his ideas into practice at his Poundbury development in Dorset. Architects like Raymond Erith, Francis Johnson and Quinlan Terry continued to practise in the classical style.)

=== Gardens ===
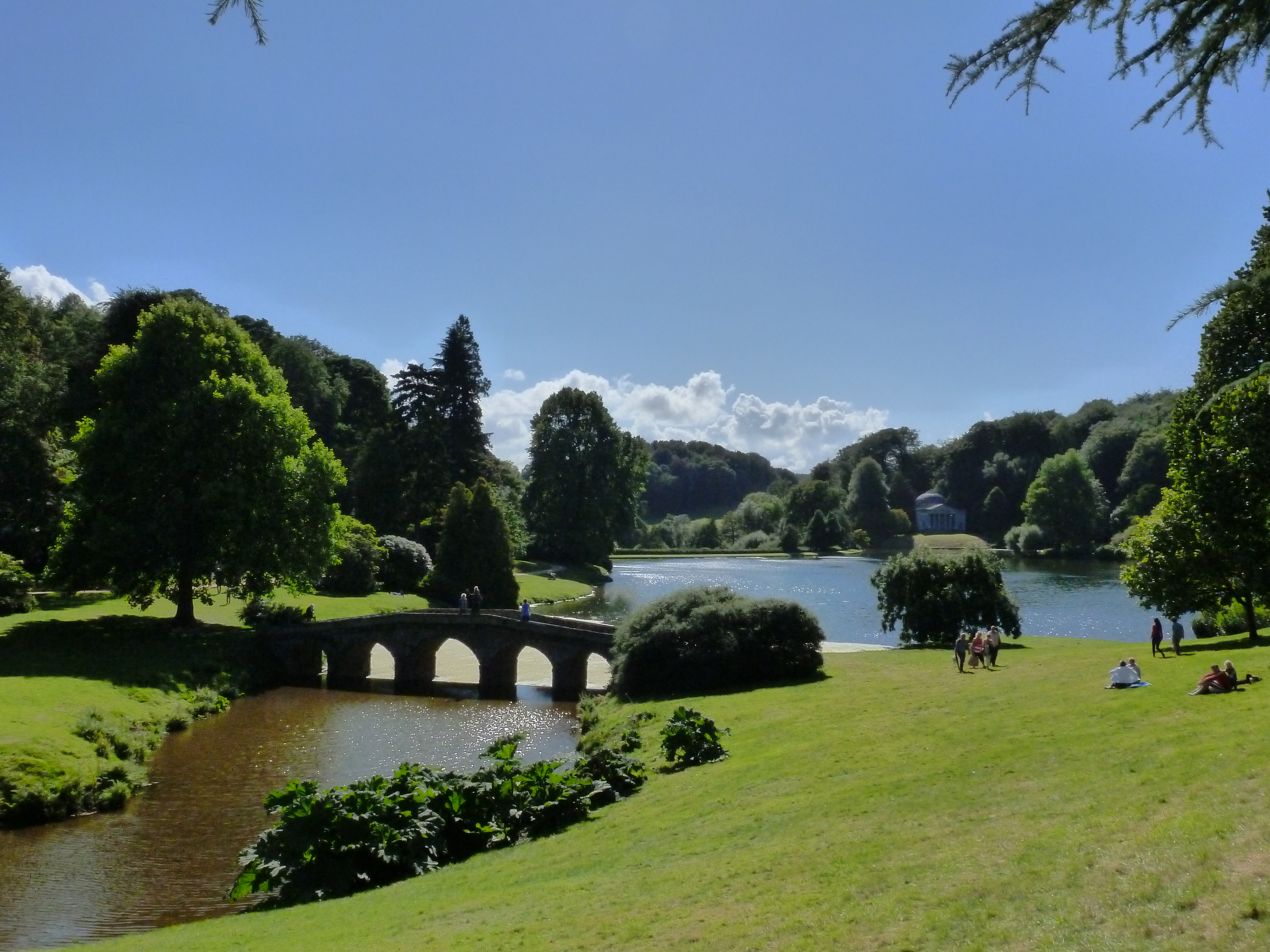
The landscape garden at Stourhead. Inspired by the great landscape artists of the seventeenth century, the landscape garden was described as a "living work of art" when first opened in the 1750s.

Landscape gardening, as developed by Capability Brown, set an international trend for the English landscape garden. Gardening, and visiting gardens, are regarded as typically English pursuits. The English garden presented an idealised view of nature. At large country houses, the English garden usually included lakes, sweeps of gently rolling lawns set against groves of trees, and recreations of classical temples, Gothic ruins, bridges, and other picturesque architecture, designed to recreate an idyllic pastoral landscape.

By the end of the 18th century, the English garden was being imitated by the French landscape garden, and as far away as Pavlovsk, Saint Petersburg, the gardens of the future Emperor Paul. It also had a major influence on the public parks and gardens which appeared around the world in the 19th century. The English landscape garden was centred on the English country house and manor houses.

English Heritage and the National Trust preserve great gardens and landscape parks throughout the country. The RHS Chelsea Flower Show is held every year by the Royal Horticultural Society and is said to be the largest gardening show in the world.

=== Folklore ===
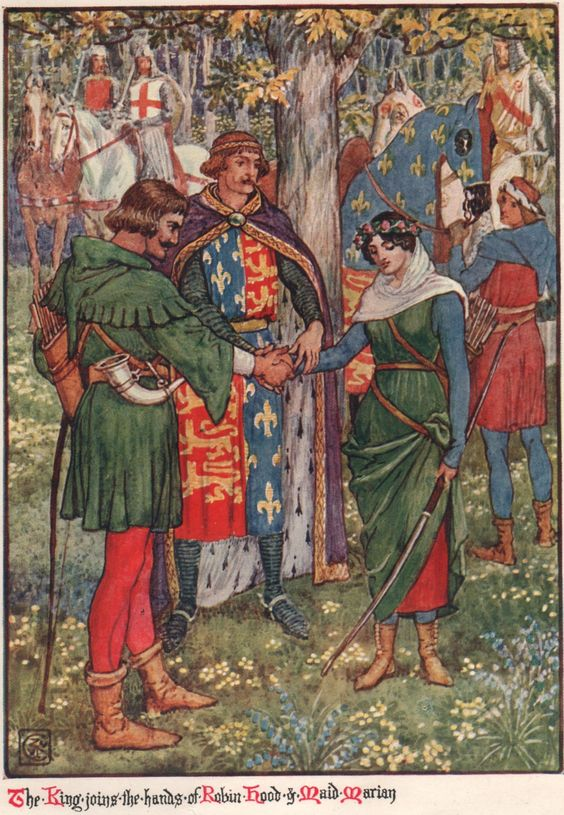
Robin Hood and Maid Marian with Richard I of England

English folklore developed over many centuries. Some of the characters and stories are present across England, but most belong to specific regions. Common folkloric beings include pixies, giants, elves, bogeymen, trolls, goblins, and dwarves. While many legends and folk-customs are thought to be ancient, such as the tales featuring Offa of Angel and Wayland the Smith, others date from after the Norman invasion. The legends featuring Robin Hood and his Merry Men of Sherwood, and their battles with the Sheriff of Nottingham, are amongst the best-known of these.

During the High Middle Ages tales originating from Brythonic traditions entered English folklore and developed into the Arthurian myth. These were derived from Anglo-Norman, Welsh and French sources, featuring King Arthur, Camelot, Excalibur, Merlin and the Knights of the Round Table such as Lancelot. These stories are most centrally brought together within Geoffrey of Monmouth's Historia Regum Britanniae (History of the Kings of Britain). (Note: These tales may have come to prominence, at least in part, as an attempt by the Norman ruling elite to legitimise their rule of the British Isles, finding Anglo-Saxon history ill-suited to the task during an era when members of the deposed House of Wessex, especially Edgar the Ætheling and his nephews of the Scottish House of Dunkeld, were still active in the isles. Also Michael Wood explains; "Over the centuries the figure of Arthur became a symbol of British history – a way of explaining the matter of Britain, the relationship between the Saxons and the Celts, and a way of exorcising ghosts and healing the wounds of the past.")

Some folk figures are based on semi or actual historical people whose story has been passed down centuries. On 5 November people celebrate Bonfire Night to commemorate the foiling of the Gunpowder Plot centred on Guy Fawkes. There are various national and regional folk activities, participated in to this day, such as Morris dancing, Maypole dancing, Rapper sword in the North East, Long Sword dance in Yorkshire, Mummers Plays, bottle-kicking in Leicestershire, and cheese-rolling at Cooper's Hill. There is no official national costume, but a few are well established such as the Pearly Kings and Queens associated with cockneys, the Royal Guard, the Morris costume and Beefeaters.

=== Cuisine ===
Since the early modern period the food of England has historically been characterised by its simplicity of approach and a reliance on the high quality of natural produce. During the Middle Ages and the Renaissance, English cuisine enjoyed an excellent reputation, though a decline began during the Industrial Revolution with increasing urbanisation. The cuisine of England has, however, recently undergone a revival, which has been recognised by food critics with some good ratings in Restaurant's best restaurant in the world charts.

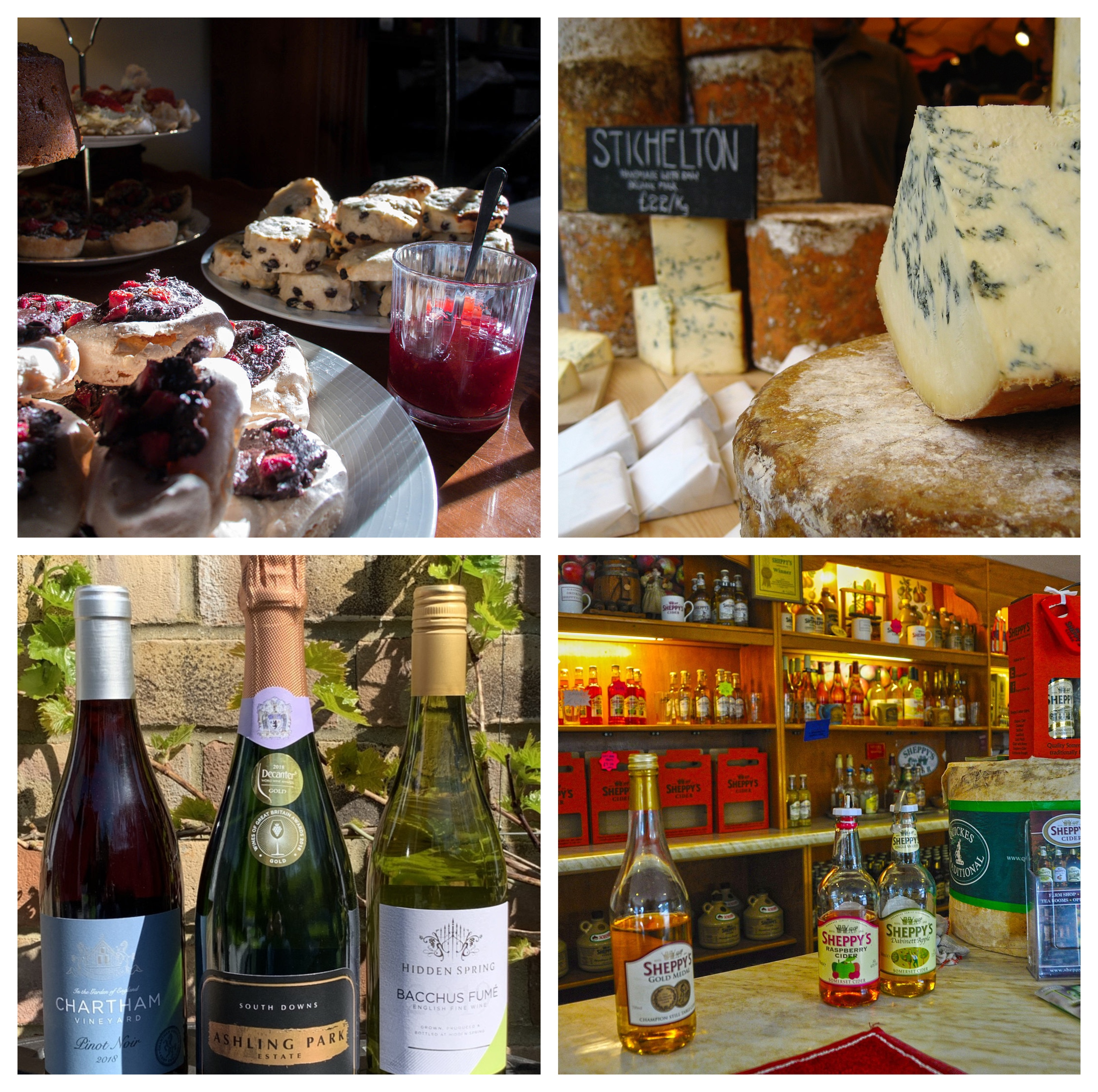
English foods: clockwise from top left—teacakes, cheeses, wines and cider

Traditional examples of English food include the Sunday roast, featuring a roasted joint (usually beef, lamb, chicken or pork) served with assorted vegetables, Yorkshire pudding and gravy. Other prominent meals include fish and chips and the full English breakfast (generally consisting of bacon, sausages, grilled tomatoes, fried bread, black pudding, baked beans, mushrooms and eggs). Various meat pies are consumed, such as steak and kidney pie, steak and ale pie, cottage pie, pork pie (usually eaten cold) and the Cornish pasty.

Sausages are commonly eaten, either as bangers and mash or as toad in the hole. Lancashire hotpot is a well-known stew originating in the northwest. Some of the more popular cheeses are Cheddar, Red Leicester, Wensleydale, Double Gloucester and Blue Stilton. Many Anglo-Indian hybrid dishes, curries, have been created, such as chicken tikka masala and balti. Traditional English dessert dishes include apple pie and other fruit pies; spotted dick – all generally served with custard; and, more recently, sticky toffee pudding. Sweet pastries include scones served with jam or cream, dried fruit loaves, Eccles cakes and mince pies as well as sweet or spiced biscuits.

Common non-alcoholic drinks include tea and coffee; frequently consumed alcoholic drinks include wine, ciders and English beers, such as bitter, mild, stout and brown ale.

=== Visual arts ===
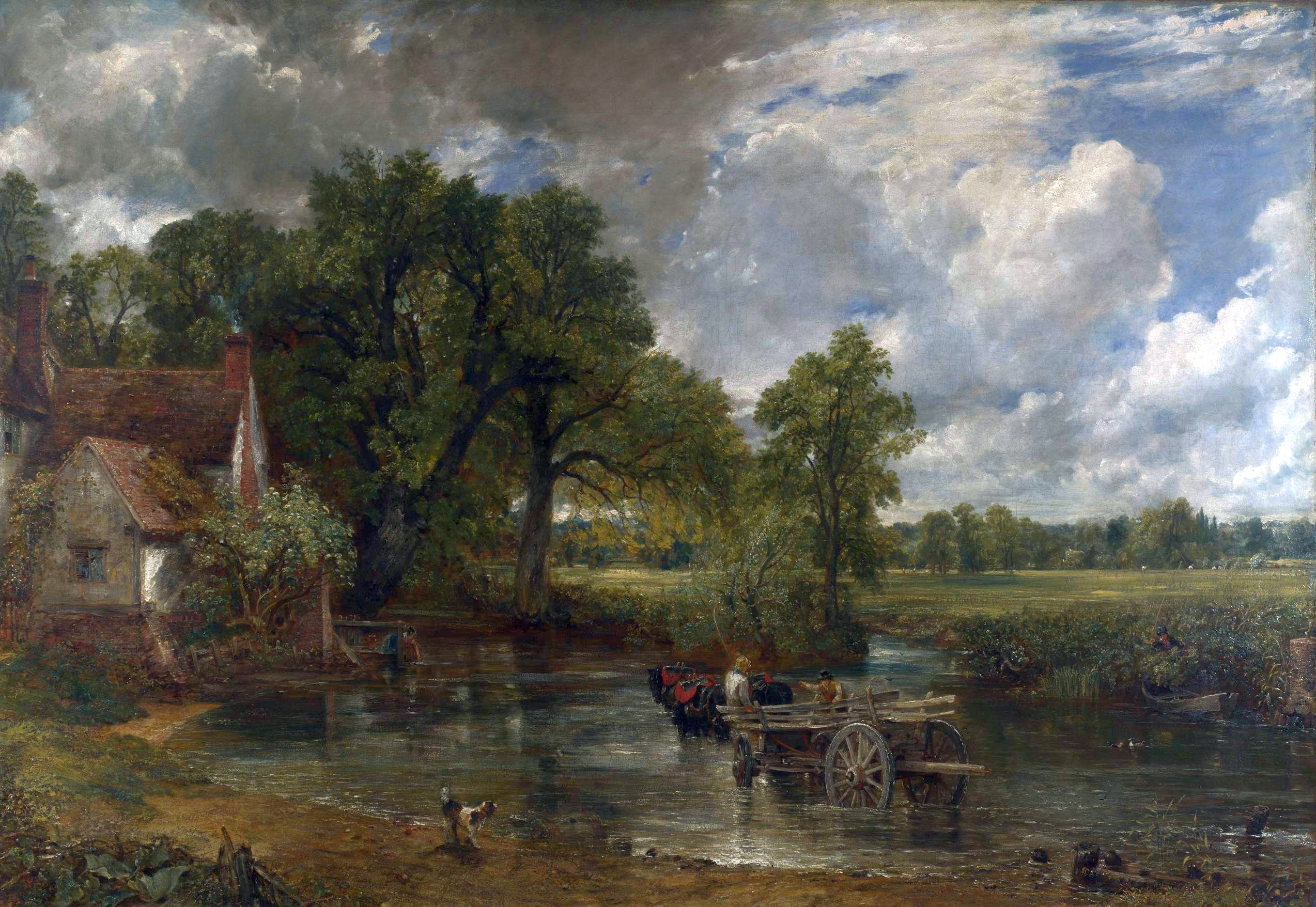
The Hay Wain by John Constable, 1821, is an archetypal English painting.

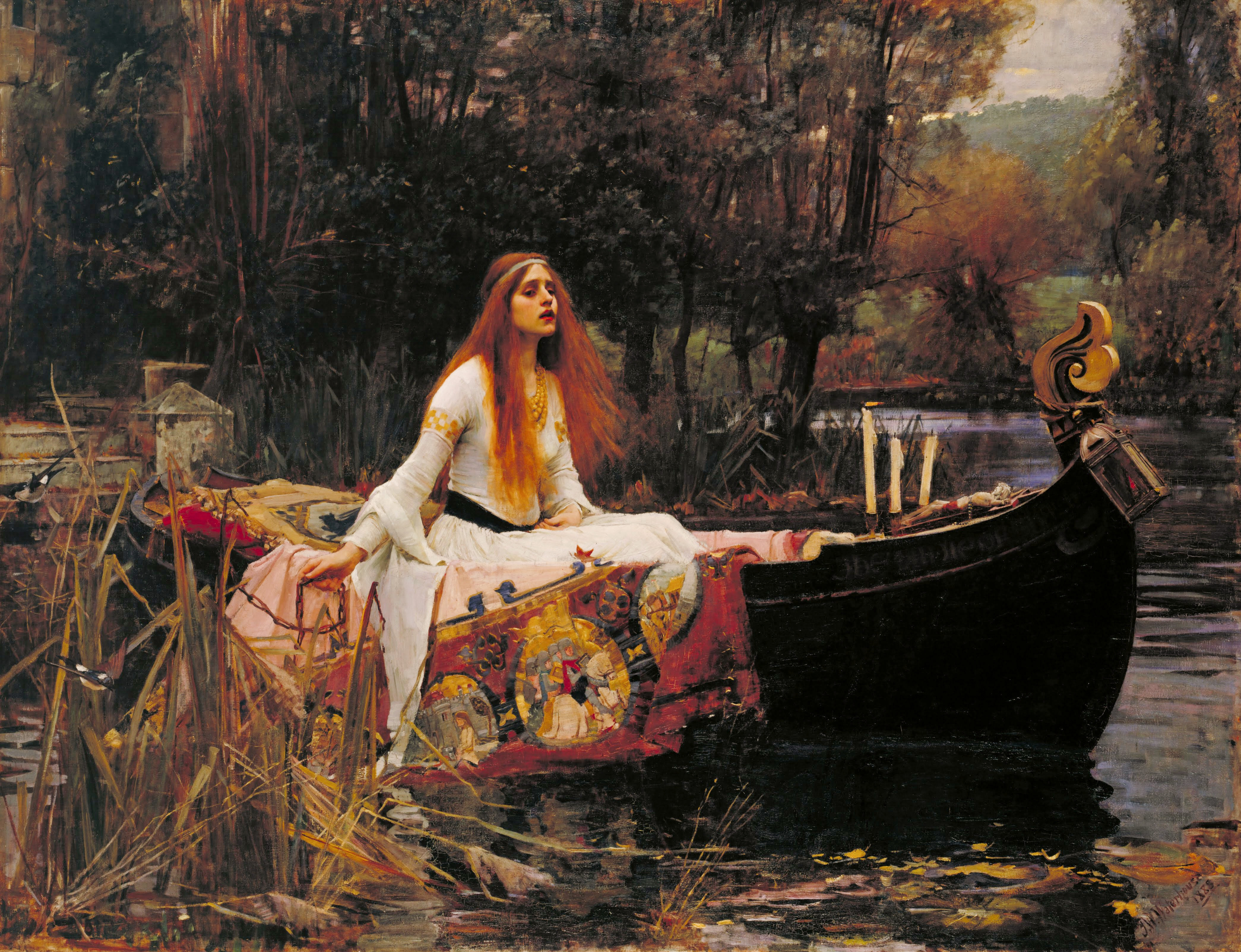
The Lady of Shalott by John William Waterhouse, 1888, in the Pre-Raphaelite style

The earliest known examples are the prehistoric rock and cave art pieces, most prominent in North Yorkshire, Northumberland and Cumbria, but also feature further south, for example at Creswell Crags. With the arrival of Roman culture in the 1st century, various forms of art such as statues, busts, glasswork and mosaics were the norm. There are numerous surviving artefacts, such as those at Lullingstone and Aldborough. During the Early Middle Ages the style favoured sculpted crosses and ivories, manuscript painting, gold and enamel jewellery, demonstrating a love of intricate, interwoven designs such as in the Staffordshire Hoard discovered in 2009. Some of these blended Gaelic and Anglian styles, such as the Lindisfarne Gospels and Vespasian Psalter. Later Gothic art was popular at Winchester and Canterbury, examples survive such as Benedictional of St. Æthelwold and Luttrell Psalter.

The Tudor era saw prominent artists as part of their court; portrait painting, which would remain an enduring part of English art, was boosted by German Hans Holbein, and natives such as Nicholas Hilliard built on this. Under the Stuarts, Continental artists were influential especially the Flemish, examples from the period include Anthony van Dyck, Peter Lely, Godfrey Kneller and William Dobson. The 18th century saw the founding of the Royal Academy; a classicism based on the High Renaissance prevailed, with Thomas Gainsborough and Joshua Reynolds becoming two of England's most treasured artists.

In the 19th century, John Constable and J. M. W. Turner were major landscape artists. The Norwich School continued the landscape tradition, while the Pre-Raphaelite Brotherhood, led by artists such as Holman Hunt, Dante Gabriel Rossetti and John Everett Millais, revived the Early Renaissance style with their vivid and detailed style. Prominent amongst 20th-century artists was Henry Moore, regarded as the voice of British sculpture, and of British modernism in general. The Royal Society of Arts is an organisation committed to the arts.

=== Literature, drama and philosophy ===
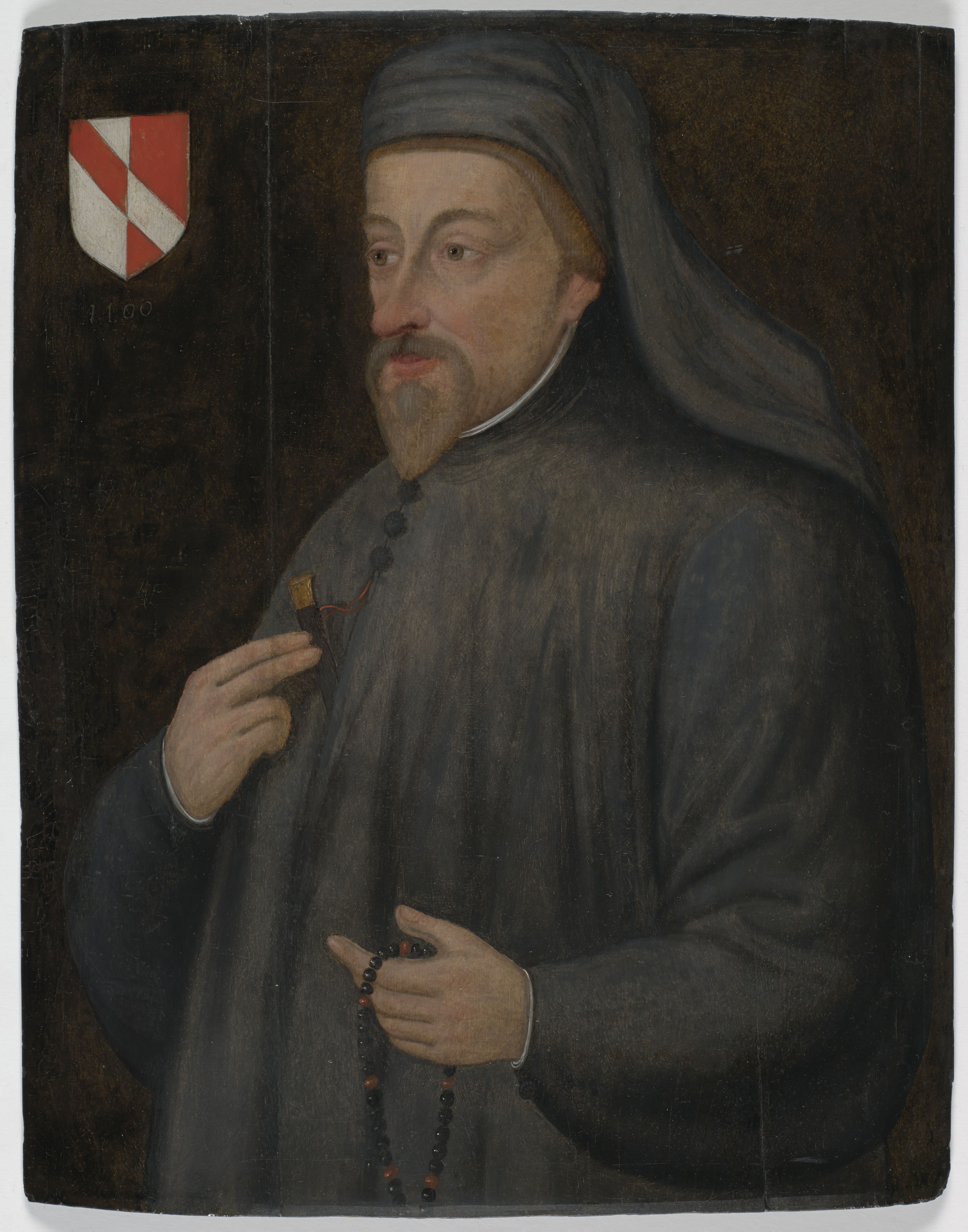
Geoffrey Chaucer was an English author, poet and philosopher, best remembered for his unfinished frame narrative The Canterbury Tales.

Early authors such as Bede and Alcuin wrote in Latin. The period of Old English literature provided the epic poem Beowulf and the secular prose of the Anglo-Saxon Chronicle, along with Christian writings such as Judith, Cædmon's Hymn and hagiographies. Following the Norman conquest Latin continued amongst the educated classes, as well as an Anglo-Norman literature.

Middle English literature emerged with Geoffrey Chaucer, author of The Canterbury Tales, along with Gower, the Pearl Poet and Langland. William of Ockham and Roger Bacon, who were Franciscans, were major philosophers of the Middle Ages. Julian of Norwich, who wrote Revelations of Divine Love, was a prominent Christian mystic. With the English Renaissance literature in the Early Modern English style appeared. William Shakespeare, whose works include Hamlet, Romeo and Juliet, Macbeth, and A Midsummer Night's Dream, remains one of the most championed authors in English literature.

Christopher Marlowe, Edmund Spenser, Philip Sydney, Thomas Kyd, John Donne, and Ben Jonson are other established authors of the Elizabethan age. Francis Bacon and Thomas Hobbes wrote on empiricism and materialism, including scientific method and social contract. Filmer wrote on the Divine Right of Kings. Marvell was the best-known poet of the Commonwealth, while John Milton authored Paradise Lost during the Restoration.

This royal throne of kings, this sceptred isle, this earth of majesty, this seat of Mars, this other Eden, demi-paradise; this fortress, built by nature for herself. This blessed plot, this earth, this realm, this England.

— William Shakespeare.

Some of the most prominent philosophers of the Enlightenment were John Locke, Thomas Paine, Samuel Johnson and Jeremy Bentham. More radical elements were later countered by Edmund Burke who is regarded as the founder of conservatism. The poet Alexander Pope with his satirical verse became well regarded. The English played a significant role in romanticism: Samuel Taylor Coleridge, Lord Byron, John Keats, Mary Shelley, Percy Bysshe Shelley, William Blake and William Wordsworth were major figures.

In response to the Industrial Revolution, agrarian writers sought a way between liberty and tradition; William Cobbett, G. K. Chesterton and Hilaire Belloc were main exponents, while the founder of guild socialism, Arthur Penty, and cooperative movement advocate G. D. H. Cole are somewhat related. Empiricism continued through John Stuart Mill and Bertrand Russell, while Bernard Williams was involved in analytics. Authors from around the Victorian era include Charles Dickens, the Brontë sisters, Jane Austen, George Eliot, Rudyard Kipling, Thomas Hardy, H. G. Wells and Lewis Carroll. Since then England has continued to produce novelists such as George Orwell, D. H. Lawrence, Virginia Woolf, C. S. Lewis, Enid Blyton, Aldous Huxley, Agatha Christie, Terry Pratchett, J. R. R. Tolkien, and J. K. Rowling.

=== Performing arts ===
Thomas Tallis' "Lamentations I"

"Greensleeves"

Henry Purcell's "The Queen's Dolour (A Farewell)"

The traditional folk music of England is centuries old and has contributed to several genres prominently; mostly sea shanties, jigs, hornpipes and dance music. It has its own distinct variations and regional peculiarities. Ballads featuring Robin Hood, printed by Wynkyn de Worde in the 16th century, are an important artefact, as are John Playford's The Dancing Master and Robert Harley's Roxburghe Ballads collections. Some of the best-known songs are Greensleeves, Pastime with Good Company, Maggie May and Spanish Ladies amongst others. Many nursery rhymes are of English origin such as Mary, Mary, Quite Contrary, Roses Are Red, Jack and Jill, London Bridge Is Falling Down, The Grand Old Duke of York, Hey Diddle Diddle and Humpty Dumpty. Traditional English Christmas carols include "We Wish You a Merry Christmas", "The First Noel", "I Saw Three Ships" and "God Rest Ye Merry, Gentlemen".

Early English composers in classical music include Renaissance artists Thomas Tallis and William Byrd, followed by Henry Purcell from the Baroque period and Thomas Arne who was well known for his patriotic song "Rule, Britannia!". German-born George Frideric Handel spent most of his composing life in London and became a national icon in Britain, creating some of the most well-known works of classical music, especially his English oratorios, The Messiah, Solomon, Water Music, and Music for the Royal Fireworks.

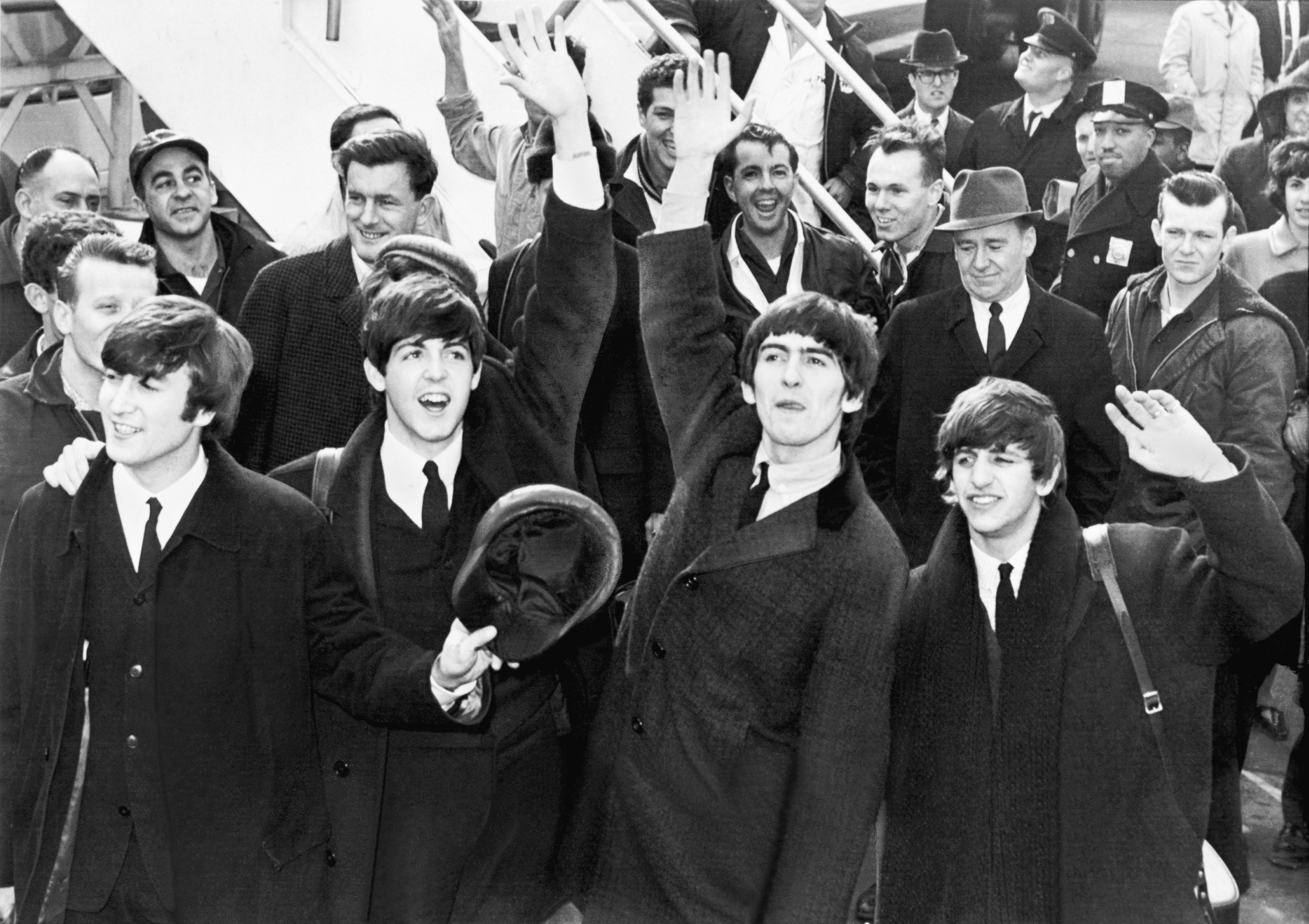
The Beatles are the most commercially successful and critically acclaimed band in popular music.

Classical music attracted much attention in the 18th century with the formation of the Birmingham Triennial Music Festival, which was the longest running classical music festival of its kind until the final concerts in 1912. The English Musical Renaissance was a hypothetical development in the late 19th and early 20th century, when English composers, often those lecturing or trained at the Royal College of Music, were said to have freed themselves from foreign musical influences. There was a revival in the profile of composers from England in the 20th century led by Edward Elgar, Benjamin Britten, Frederick Delius, Gustav Holst, Ralph Vaughan Williams and others. Present-day composers from England include Michael Nyman, best known for The Piano, and Andrew Lloyd Webber, whose musicals have achieved enormous success in the West End and worldwide.

In popular music, many English bands and solo artists have been cited as the most influential and best-selling musicians of all time. Acts such as the Beatles, Led Zeppelin, Pink Floyd, Elton John, Queen, Rod Stewart, David Bowie, the Rolling Stones and Def Leppard are amongst the highest-selling recording artists in the world. Many musical genres have origins in (or strong associations with) England, such as British Invasion, progressive rock, hard rock, Mod, glam rock, heavy metal, Britpop, indie rock, gothic rock, shoegazing, acid house, garage, trip hop, drum and bass and dubstep.

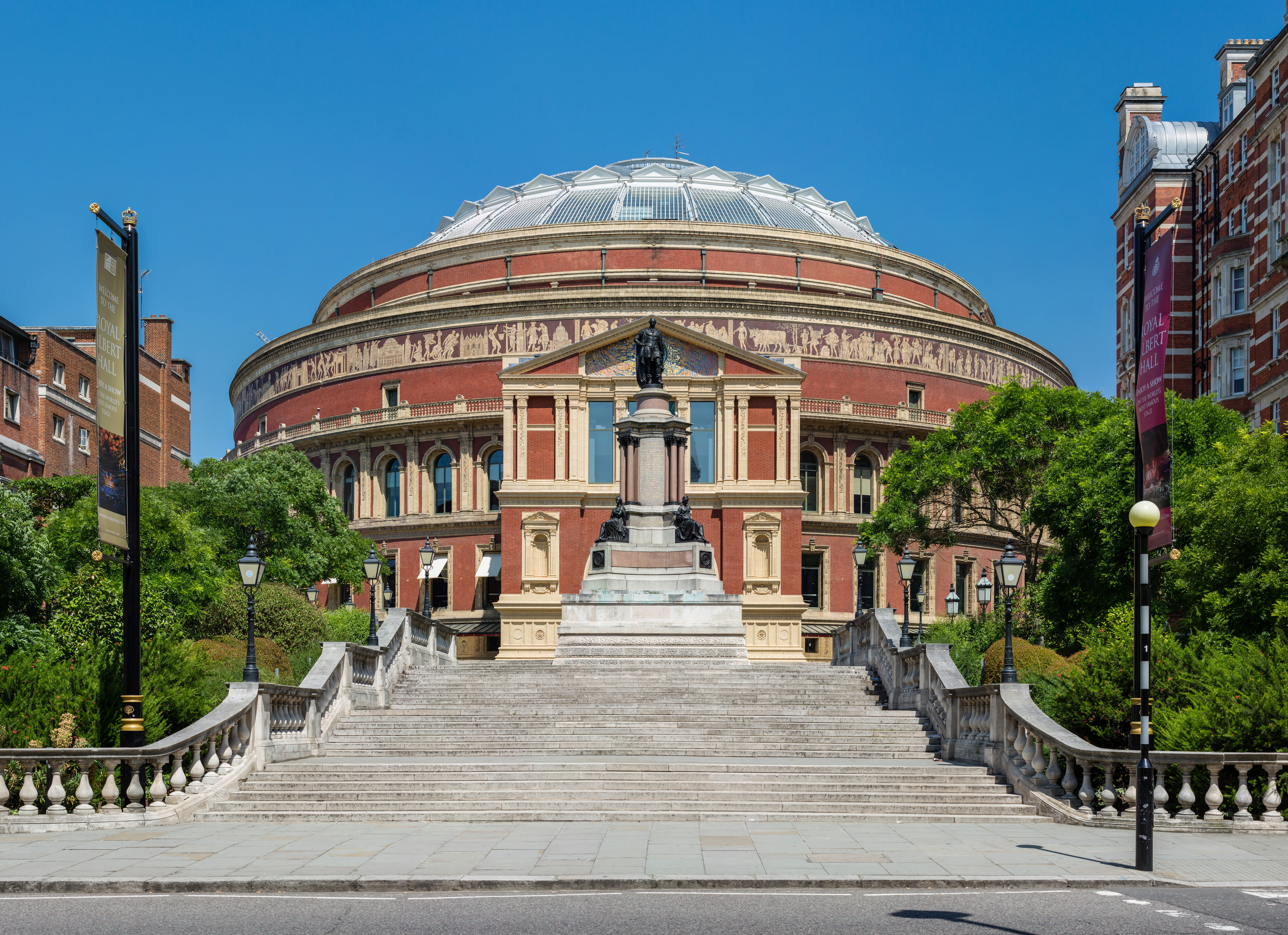
The Royal Albert Hall. Since the hall's opening in 1871, the world's leading artists from many performance genres have appeared on its stage.

Large outdoor music festivals in the summer and autumn are popular, such as Glastonbury, V Festival, and the Reading and Leeds Festivals. England was at the forefront of the illegal, free rave movement from the late 1980s, which inspired the pan-European culture of teknivals. The Boishakhi Mela is a Bengali New Year festival celebrated by the British Bangladeshi community. It is the largest open-air Asian festival in Europe. After the Notting Hill Carnival, it is the second-largest street festival in the UK, attracting over 80,000 visitors.

The most prominent opera house in England is the Royal Opera House at Covent Garden. The Proms is a major annual cultural event in the English calendar. The Royal Ballet is one of the world's foremost classical ballet companies. The Royal Academy of Music is the oldest conservatoire in the UK, founded in 1822, receiving its royal charter in 1830. England is home to numerous major orchestras such as the BBC Symphony Orchestra, the Royal Philharmonic Orchestra, the Philharmonia Orchestra, and the London Symphony Orchestra. Other forms of entertainment that originated in England include the circus and the pantomime.

=== Cinema ===
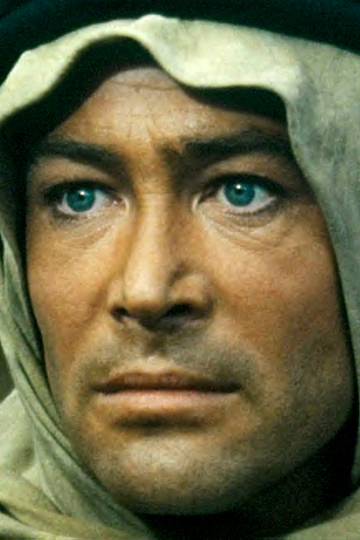
Peter O'Toole as T. E. Lawrence in David Lean's 1962 epic Lawrence of Arabia

England has had a considerable influence on the history of the cinema, producing some of the greatest actors, directors and motion pictures of all time, including Alfred Hitchcock, Charlie Chaplin, David Lean, Laurence Olivier, Vivien Leigh, John Gielgud, Peter Sellers, Julie Andrews, Michael Caine, Gary Oldman, Helen Mirren, Kate Winslet and Daniel Day-Lewis. Hitchcock and Lean are amongst the most critically acclaimed filmmakers. Hitchcock's The Lodger: A Story of the London Fog (1926) helped shape the thriller genre in film, while his 1929 Blackmail is often regarded as the first British sound feature film.

Major film studios in England include Pinewood, Elstree and Shepperton. Some of the most commercially successful films of all time have been produced in England, including two of the highest-grossing film franchises (Harry Potter and James Bond). Ealing Studios in London has a claim to being the oldest continuously working film studio in the world. Famous for recording many motion picture film scores, the London Symphony Orchestra first performed film music in 1935. The Hammer Horror films starring Christopher Lee saw the production of the first gory horror films showing blood and guts in colour.

The BFI Top 100 British films includes Monty Python's Life of Brian (1979), a film regularly voted the funniest of all time by the UK public. English producers are also active in international co-productions and English actors, directors and crew feature regularly in American films. The UK film council ranked David Yates, Christopher Nolan, Mike Newell, Ridley Scott and Paul Greengrass the five most commercially successful English directors since 2001. Other contemporary English directors include Sam Mendes, Guy Ritchie and Richard Curtis. Current actors include Tom Hardy, Daniel Craig, Benedict Cumberbatch, Lena Headey, Felicity Jones, Emilia Clarke, Lashana Lynch, and Emma Watson. Acclaimed for his motion capture work, Andy Serkis opened The Imaginarium Studios in London in 2011. The visual effects company Framestore in London has produced some of the most critically acclaimed special effects in modern film. Many successful Hollywood films have been based on English people, stories or events. The 'English Cycle' of Disney animated films include Alice in Wonderland, The Jungle Book and Winnie the Pooh.

=== Sites and institutions ===
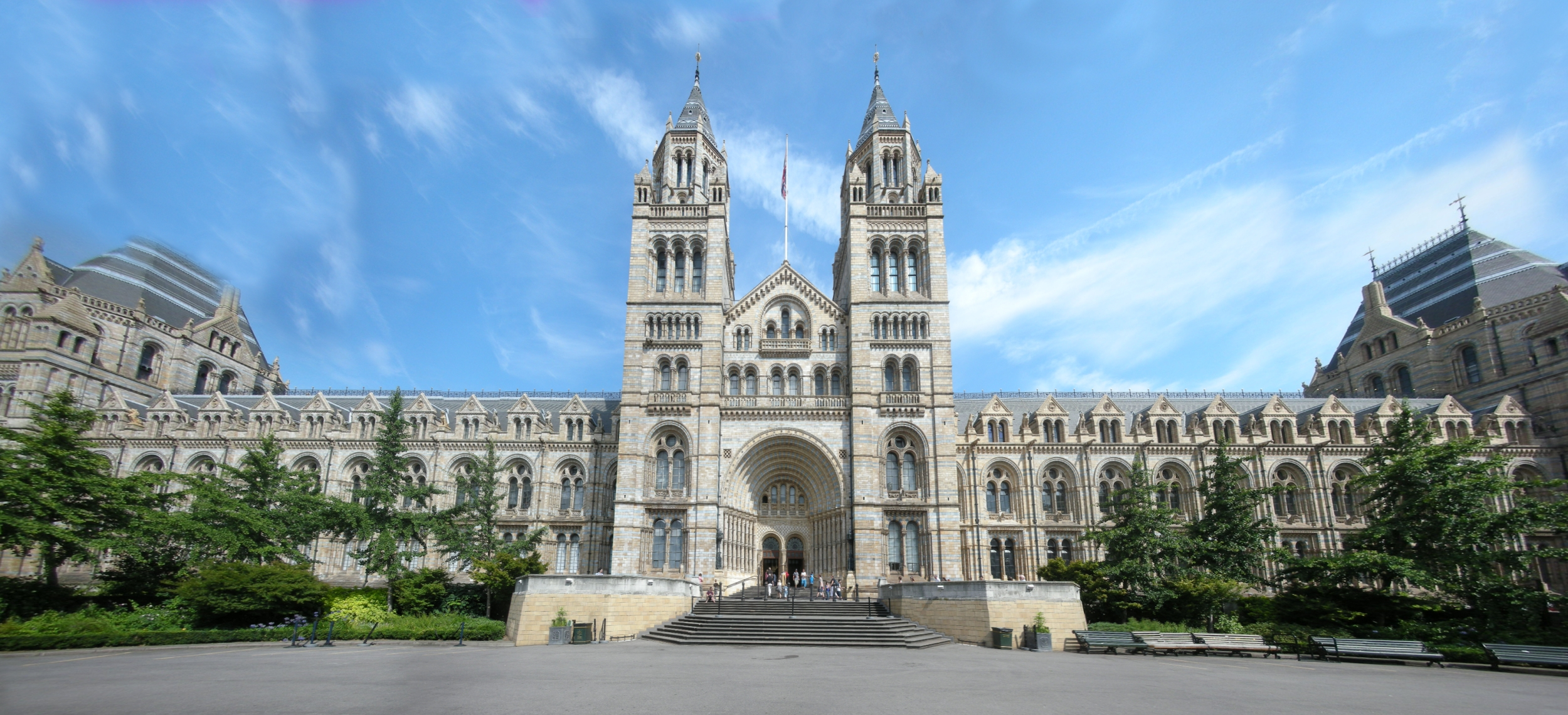
The Natural History Museum in London

English Heritage is a governmental body with a broad remit of managing the historic sites, artefacts and environments of England. It is currently sponsored by the Department for Culture, Media and Sport. A non-governmental charity, the National Trust holds a complementary role, focussed on landscapes and country houses. 17 of the 25 United Kingdom UNESCO World Heritage Sites fall within England. Some of the best-known of these are: Hadrian's Wall, Stonehenge, Avebury and Associated Sites, the Tower of London, the Jurassic Coast, Saltaire, Ironbridge Gorge, Blenheim Palace and the Lake District.

London's British Museum holds more than seven million objects, one of the largest and most comprehensive collections in the world, illustrating and documenting global human culture from its beginnings to the present. The British Library in London is the national library and is one of the world's largest research libraries, holding over 150 million items in almost all known languages and formats, including around 25 million books. The National Gallery in Trafalgar Square houses a collection of over 2,300 paintings dating from the mid-13th century to 1900. The Tate galleries house the national collections of British and international modern art; they also host the Turner Prize.

The secretary of state for culture, media and sport has overall responsibility for cultural property and heritage. A blue plaque, the oldest historical marker scheme in the world, is a permanent sign installed in a public place in England to commemorate a link between that location and a famous person or event. In 2011 there were around 1,600 museums in England. Entry to most museums and galleries is free. London is one of the world's most visited cities, regularly taking the top five most visited cities in Europe. It is considered a global centre of finance, art and culture.

=== Media ===
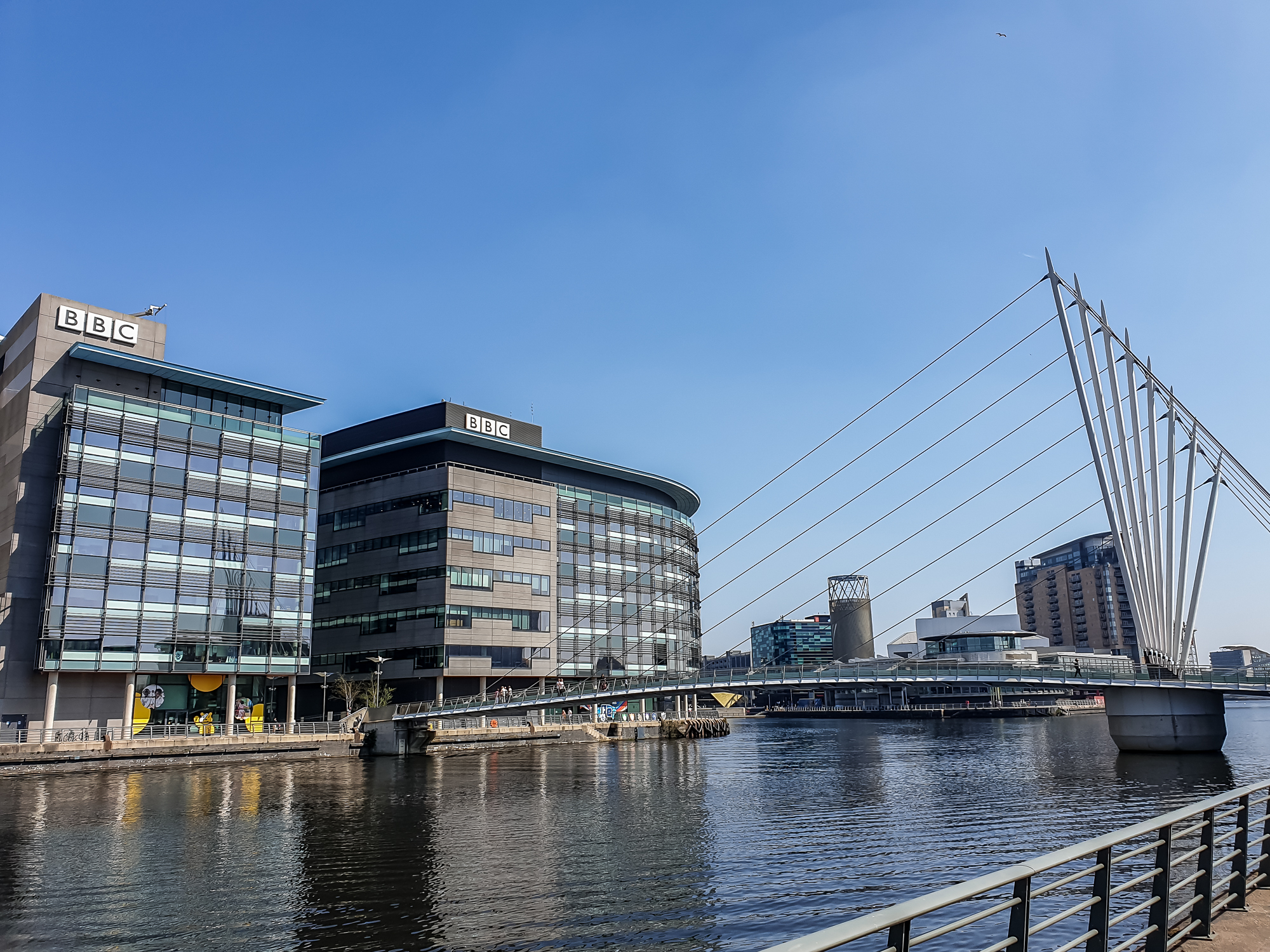
MediaCity in Manchester is the largest media-production facility in Europe.

The British Broadcasting Corporation (BBC), founded in 1922, is the UK's publicly funded radio, television and Internet broadcasting corporation, and is the oldest and largest broadcaster in the world. It operates numerous television and radio stations in the UK and abroad and its domestic services are funded by the television licence.

The BBC World Service is an international broadcaster owned and operated by the BBC. It is the world's largest of any kind. It broadcasts radio news, speech and discussions in more than 40 languages.

London dominates the media sector in England: national newspapers and television and radio are largely based there, although Manchester is also a significant national media centre. The UK publishing sector, including books, directories and databases, journals, magazines and business media, newspapers and news agencies, has a combined turnover of around £20 billion and employs around 167,000 people. National newspapers produced in England include The Times, The Guardian, The Daily Telegraph, and the Financial Times.

Magazines and journals published in England that have achieved worldwide circulation include Nature, New Scientist, The Spectator, Prospect, NME and The Economist. The Secretary of State for Culture, Media and Sport has overall responsibility over media and broadcasting in England.

=== Sport ===
England has a strong sporting heritage, and during the 19th century codified many sports that are now played around the world. Sports originating in England include association football, cricket, rugby union, rugby league, tennis, boxing, badminton, squash, rounders, hockey, bandy, snooker, billiards, darts, table tennis, bowls, netball, thoroughbred horseracing, greyhound racing and fox hunting. It has helped the development of golf, sailing and Formula One. England has been crowned world champion in several major sports including: cricket, rugby and association football.

Football is the most popular of these sports. The England national football team, whose home venue is Wembley Stadium, played Scotland in the first-ever international football match in 1872. Referred to as the "home of football" by FIFA, England hosted and won the 1966 FIFA World Cup. With a British television audience peak of 32.30 million viewers, the final is the most watched television event ever in the UK. England is recognised by FIFA as the birthplace of club football: Sheffield F.C., founded in 1857, is the world's oldest club. The England women's national football team won the UEFA Women's Euro 2022, hosted by England. England was also victorious in the UEFA Women's Euro 2025, winning the final in a penalty shootout against Spain.

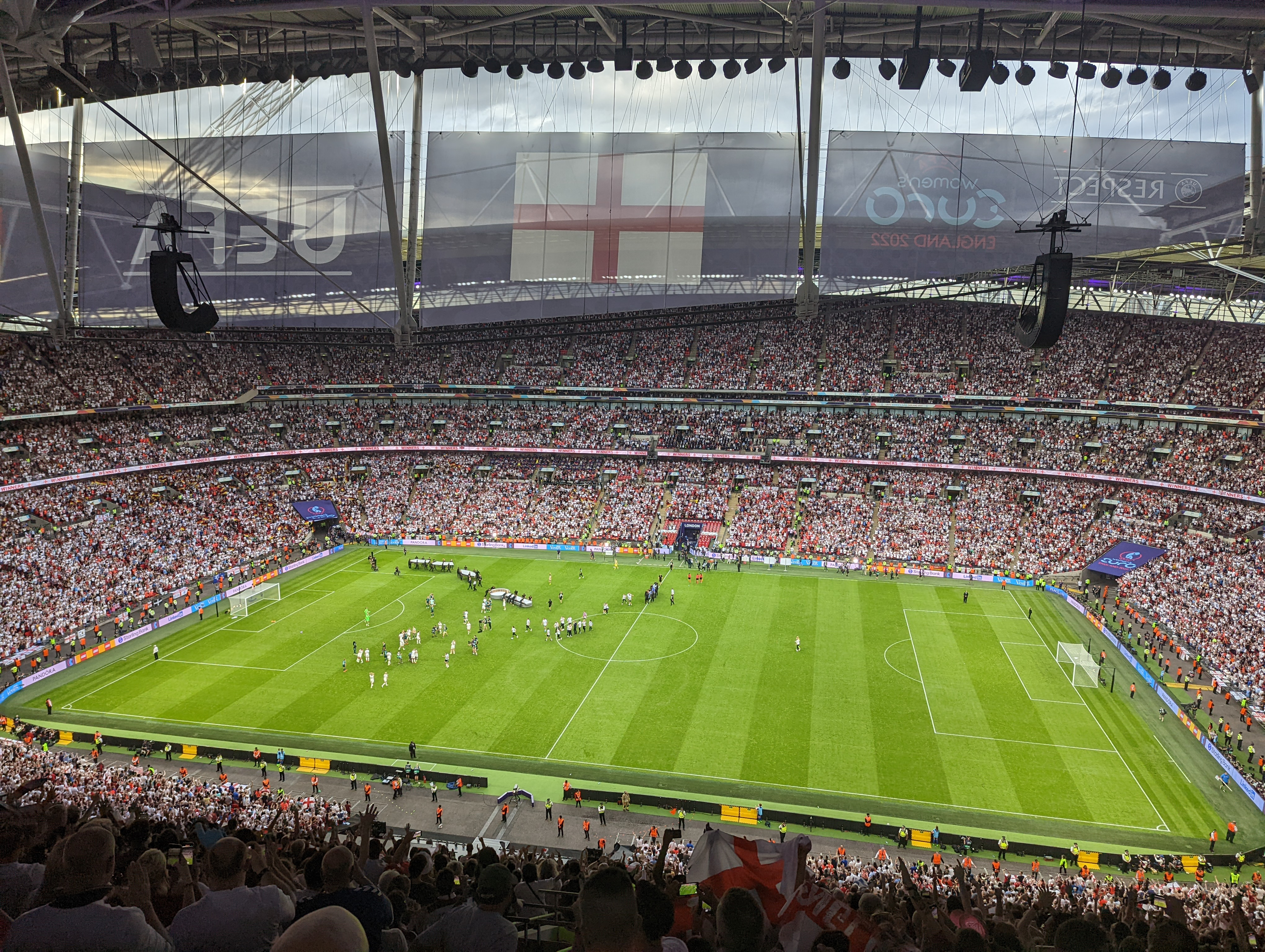
Wembley Stadium, home of the England football team, during the UEFA Women's Euro 2022 final. At 90,000 capacity, it is the biggest stadium in the UK and the second-largest stadium in Europe.

Cricket is generally thought to have been developed in the early medieval period amongst the farming and metalworking communities of the Weald. The England cricket team is a composite England and Wales team. One of the game's top rivalries is The Ashes series between England and Australia, contested since 1882. Lord's Cricket Ground situated in London is sometimes referred to as the "Mecca of Cricket". After winning the 2019 Cricket World Cup, England became the first country to win the World Cups in football, rugby union, and cricket.

William Penny Brookes was prominent in organising the format for the modern Olympic Games. London has hosted the Summer Olympic Games three times, in 1908, 1948, and 2012. England competes in the Commonwealth Games, held every four years. Sport England is the governing body responsible for distributing funds and providing strategic guidance for sporting activity in England.

Rugby union originated in Rugby School, Warwickshire in the early 19th century. The top level of club participation is the English Premiership. England's Red Roses won the 2025 Women's Rugby World Cup. Rugby league was born in Huddersfield in 1895. Since 2008, the England national rugby league team has been a full test nation in lieu of the Great Britain national rugby league team, which won three World Cups. Club sides play in Super League, the present-day embodiment of the Rugby Football League Championship. Rugby League is most popular amongst towns in the northern English counties of Lancashire, Yorkshire and Cumbria.

Golf has been prominent in England, due in part to its cultural and geographical ties to Scotland where it originated. There are professional tours for men and women, in two main tours: the PGA and the European Tour. The world's oldest golf tournament, and golf's first major is The Open Championship, played both in England and Scotland. The biennial golf competition, the Ryder Cup, is named after English businessman Samuel Ryder.

Tennis was created in Birmingham in the late 19th century, and the Wimbledon Championships is the oldest tennis tournament in the world, and widely considered the most prestigious. Wimbledon has a major place in the English cultural calendar.

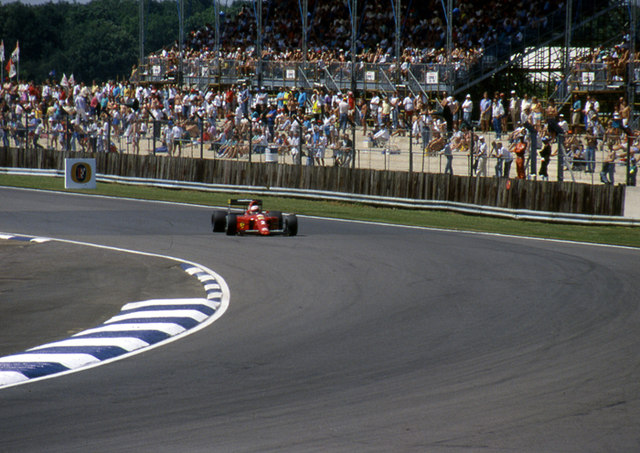
Former Formula One world champion Nigel Mansell driving at Silverstone in 1990. The circuit hosted the first ever World Championship Formula One race in 1950.

In boxing, under the Marquess of Queensberry Rules, England has produced many world champions across the weight divisions internationally recognised by the governing bodies.

Originating in 17th and 18th-century England, the thoroughbred is a horse breed best known for its use in horse racing. The National Hunt horse race the Grand National, is held annually at Aintree Racecourse in early April. It is the most watched horse race in the UK, and three-time winner Red Rum is the most successful racehorse in the event's history.

The 1950 British Grand Prix at Silverstone was the first race in the newly created Formula One World Championship. England has seen the manufacture some of the most technically advanced racing cars, and many of today's racing companies choose England as their base of operations. England also has a rich heritage in Grand Prix motorcycle racing, the premier championship of motorcycle road racing, and has produced several world champions.

Darts is a widely popular sport in England; a professional competitive sport, it is a traditional pub game. Another popular sport commonly associated with pub games is snooker, and England has produced several world champions.

The English are keen sailors and enjoy competitive sailing; founding and winning some of the world's most famous international competitive tournaments across the various race formats, including the match race, a regatta, and the America's Cup.

== National symbols ==
The Tudor rose, England's national floral emblem

The Royal Arms of England

The St George's Cross has been the national flag of England since the 13th century. Originally, the flag was used by the maritime Republic of Genoa. The English monarch paid a tribute to the Doge of Genoa from 1190 onwards so that English ships could fly the flag as a means of protection when entering the Mediterranean. A red cross was a symbol for many Crusaders in the 12th and 13th centuries, and became associated with Saint George. Since 1606 the St George's Cross has formed part of the design of the Union Flag, a Pan-British flag designed by King James I. During the English Civil War and Interregnum, the New Model Army's standards and the Commonwealth's Great Seal both incorporated the flag of Saint George.

There are numerous other symbols and symbolic artefacts, both official and unofficial, including the Tudor rose, the nation's floral emblem, and the Three Lions featured on the Royal Arms of England. The Tudor rose was adopted as a national emblem of England around the time of the Wars of the Roses as a symbol of peace. It is a syncretic symbol in that it merged the white rose of the Yorkists and the red rose of the Lancastrians. It is also known as the Rose of England. The oak tree is a symbol of England: the Royal Oak symbol and Oak Apple Day commemorate the escape of King Charles II after his father's execution, when he hid in an oak to avoid detection by the parliamentarians before safely reaching exile.

The Royal Arms of England, a national coat of arms featuring three lions, originated with Richard the Lionheart in 1198. It is blazoned as gules, three lions passant guardant or and it provides one of the most prominent symbols of England. England does not have an official national anthem, as the United Kingdom as a whole has God Save the King. However, Jerusalem, Land of Hope and Glory (used for England during the 2002 Commonwealth Games), and I Vow to Thee, My Country are often considered unofficial English national anthems. England's National Day is 23 April which is Saint George's Day: Saint George is the patron saint of England.

== See also ==
- Outline of England
- Outline of the United Kingdom
