= The First Noel =

English Christmas carol

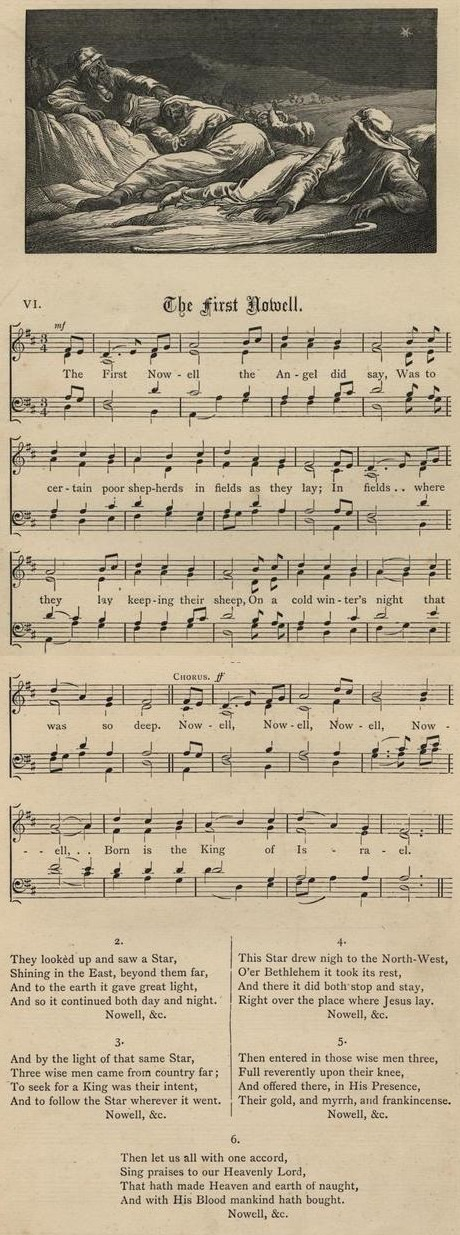
"The First Nowell" in Carols, New and Old (1879)

"The First Nowell" (or Nowel), modernised as "The First Noel" (or Noël), is a traditional English Christmas carol with Cornish origins most likely from the early modern period, although possibly earlier. It is listed as number 682 in the Roud Folk Song Index.

== Origin and history ==
"The First Nowell" is of Cornish origin. Its current form was first published in Carols Ancient and Modern (1823) and Gilbert and Sandys Carols (1833), both of which were edited by William Sandys and arranged and edited by Davies Gilbert (who also wrote extra lyrics) for Hymns and Carols of God.

Nowell is an Early Modern English synonym of "Christmas" from French Noël, "the Christmas season", ultimately from Latin natalis [dies] "[day] of birth". The word was regularly used in the burden of carols in the Middle Ages towards the early modern period; Sir Christèmas (Ritson Manuscript), "Nowell sing we now all and some" (Trinity Carol Roll) and "Nowel – out of youre slepe arise and wake" (Selden Carol Book) being 15th century examples. As a result, the word also came to be used to mean a Christmas song or carol.

The melody is unusual among English folk melodies in that it consists of one musical phrase repeated twice, followed by a refrain which is a variation on that phrase. All three phrases end on the third of the scale. Writing in the Journal of the Folk-Song Society in 1915, Anne Gilchrist notes it was not recorded prior to Sandys' publication. She speculated based on a set of church gallery parts discovered in Westmorland that the tune may have had its origin as a treble part to another carol "Hark, hark what news the angels bring"; her suggestion was that the treble part was passed down orally and was later remembered as the melody rather than a harmony. A conjectural reconstruction of this earlier version can be found in The New Oxford Book of Carols.

Today, "The First Nowell" is usually performed in a four-part hymn arrangement by the English composer John Stainer, first published in his Carols, New and Old in 1871. Variations of its theme are included in Victor Hely-Hutchinson's Carol Symphony.

American folklorist James Madison Carpenter made audio recordings of several traditional versions of the song in Cornwall in the early 1930s, which can be heard online via the Vaughan Williams Memorial Library.

== Textual comparison ==
In common with many traditional songs and carols, the lyrics vary across books. The versions compared below are taken from The New English Hymnal (1986) (which is the version used in Henry Ramsden Bramley and John Stainer's Carols, New and Old), Ralph Dunstan's gallery version in the Cornish Songbook (1929) and Reverend Charles Lewis Hutchins's version in Carols Old and Carols New (1916).

The annunciation to the shepherds and the adoration of the shepherds are episodes in the nativity of Jesus described in the second chapter of the Gospel of Luke (Luke 2). The Star of Bethlehem appears in the story of the Magi (the Wise Men) in the Gospel of Matthew; it does not appear in the story of the shepherds.

The New English Hymnal.	Cornish Songbook.	Carols Old and Carols New.
1. The first Nowell the angel did say Was to certain poor shepherds in fields as they lay; In fields where they lay, keeping their sheep, On a cold winter's night that was so deep: Refrain; Nowell, Nowell, Nowell, Nowell, Born is the King of Israel.	O well, O well, the Angels did say To shepherds there in the fields did lay; Late in the night a-folding their sheep, A winter's night, both cold and bleak. Refrain; O well, O well, O well, O well, Born is the King of Israel.	The first Noel, the angels say To Bethlehem's shepherds as they lay. At midnight watch, when keeping sheep, The winter wild, the light snow deep Refrain; Noel, Noel, Noel, Noel; Born is the King of Israel.
2. They looked up and saw a star, Shining in the east, beyond them far: And to the earth it gave great light, And so it continued both day and night:	And then there did appear a Star, Whose glory then did shine so far: Unto the earth it gave a great light, And there it continued a day and a night.	The shepherds rose, and saw a star Bright in the East, beyond them far, Its beauty gave them great delight, This star it set now day nor night.
3. And by the light of that same star, Three Wise Men came from country far; To seek for a King was their intent, And to follow the star whersoever it went:	And by the light of that same Star, Three Wise Men came from country far; To seek a King was their intent – They follow'd the Star wherever it went.	Now by the light of this bright star Three wise men came from country far; They sought a king, such their intent, The star their guide where'er it went.
4. This star drew nigh to the north-west; O'er Bethlehem it took its rest; And there it did both stop and stay Right over the place where Jesus lay:	The Star went before them unto the North West, And seemed o'er the City of Bethlehem to rest, And there did remain by night and by day, Right over the place where Jesus Christ lay.	Then drawing nigh to the northwest, O'er Bethlehem town it took its rest; The wise men learnt its cause of stay, And found the place where Jesus lay.
5. Then entered in those Wise Men three, Full reverently upon their knee, And offered there in his presence, Their gold and myrrh and frankincense:	Then enter'd in these Wise Men three, With reverence fall on their knee, And offer'd up in His presence The gifts of gold and frankincense.	
6. Then let us all with one accord Sing praises to our heavenly Lord; That hath made heaven and earth of nought, And with his blood mankind hath bought:	'Tween an ox manger and an ass, Our Blest Messiah's place it was; To save us all from bond and thrall, He was a Redeemer for us all!	

== Charts ==
=== Mariah Carey version ===
Chart (2010)	Peak position
South Korea International (Gaon)	62

=== Whitney Houston version ===
==== Weekly charts ====
Chart (2012–2021)	Peak position
U.S. Gospel Digital Songs (Billboard)	12
U.S. Gospel Streaming Songs (Billboard)	1
U.S. Holiday 100 (Billboard)	99

==== Year-end charts ====
Chart (2017)	Peak position
U.S. Gospel Streaming Songs (Billboard)	49
Chart (2018)	Peak position
U.S. Gospel Streaming Songs (Billboard)	21
Chart (2019)	Peak position
U.S. Gospel Streaming Songs (Billboard)	48

=== Glee Cast version ===
Chart (2012–2013)	Peak position
U.S. Holiday Digital Song Sales (Billboard)	49

=== Gabby Barrett version ===
Chart (2020)	Peak position
Canada AC (Billboard)	33
US Billboard Hot 100	78
US Hot Country Songs (Billboard)	19

=== Andy Williams version ===
Chart (2026)	Peak position
Global 200 (Billboard)	192

=== TobyMac and Owl City version ===
Chart (2011–2012)	Peak position
U.S. Christian Songs (Billboard)	30
U.S. Holiday Digital Song Sales (Billboard)	18

== See also ==
- List of Christmas carols
