= Lady Isabel's Tragedy =

Old English ballad

Lady Isabel's Tragedy, or "The Lady Isabella's Tragedy; or, The Step-Mother's Cruelty" is a broadside ballad, which dates from, by estimation of the English Short Title Catalogue, as early as 1672 and as late as 1779—suggesting its popularity and positive reception. The ballad begins, "There was a Lord of worthy Fame." Copies of the ballad can be found at the National Library of Scotland, the British Library, University of Glasgow Library, the Huntington Library, and the Pepys Library at Magdalene College. Alternatively, online facsimiles of the ballad are available for public consumption at sites like the English Broadside Ballad Archive. The ballad has notable connections to the stories of Snow White, the myth of Philomela, and Titus Andronicus.

== Tune ==
Extant copies of "The Lady Isabella's Tragedy," found at the English Broadside Ballad Archive of University of California, Santa Barbara, are set to the tune of "The Lady's Fall"/"The Ladies Fall"—a popular tune in the seventeenth century synonymous with "In Peascod Time." Simpson states that early editions of this ballad were set to The Ballad of Chevy Chase, a very popular tune with a long song history, before 1675; after 1675, the tune changed to The Lady's Fall, which suggests a certain amount of continuity, if not synonymity, between the tunes.

== Synopsis ==
The ballad begins with a well-established and liked Lord whose pride and joy is his only daughter, Isabella. In fairy-tale like fashion, Isabella's stepmother despises her because of the trance she holds over her husband. The stepmother then conspires with the Master-Cook to kill Isabella. The stepmother tells Isabella to rush to the Master-Cook and tell him to prepare the milk-white doe to eat. The Master-Cook replies that she, Isabella, is the milk-white doe he is to prepare; he kills her, minces her body, and prepares it into a pie. The Lord returns and cannot find his beloved daughter, and he is later told, by the do-good scullion boy, that she can be found in the pie. The Lord burns the stepmother at the stake and boils the Master-Cook in oil.

The ballad ends with a Lamentation in which both the stepmother and the Master-Cook confess their sins. The latter admits that he did so only at the orders of the stepmother. The stepmother acknowledges her deed and accepts her fate.

== Notes ==
A play published in 1599, The Stepmother's Tragedy, by Henry Chettle and Thomas Dekker bears both a similar title and plot summary. It is uncertain whether the play or the ballad came first. However, there are no extant copies of play to date.
