= English Broadside Ballad Archive =

Digital library of English Broadside Ballads

The English Broadside Ballad Archive (EBBA) is a digital library of 17th-century English Broadside Ballads, a project of the English Department of the University of California, Santa Barbara. The project archives ballads in multiple accessible digital formats.

== History ==
The English Broadside Ballad Archive was created in 2003 by Patricia Fumerton, Professor of English at UCSB to digitize broadside ballads of the heyday of the 17th century. Many of these ballads are currently held in difficult to access libraries in both North America and the United Kingdom, often in fragile condition, and EBBA's aim is to make them accessible to users in a variety of digital formats. Since then, EBBA has received six Collections and Resources grants from the National Endowment for the Humanities (NEH), an NEH Digital Humanities Start-Up Grant, and Faculty Research Grants and Instructional Improvement Grants from the University of California, Santa Barbara. As of August 2015, the project has archived over 7000 of the estimated 11,000 extant broadside ballads.

== Scope ==
As of August 2015, EBBA has archived 7,124 broadside ballads, from 20 different collections held at six different libraries worldwide. The collections range from the very well-known and recognized by name - such as those housed at the Pepys Library of Magdalene College, Cambridge - to the relatively unknown. The project has currently archived ballads from the following libraries, with partnerships in place to begin archiving ballads from several other libraries in the next two years.

=== Holding Libraries and Named Collections ===
- British Library
  - Roxburghe Ballads
- Glasgow University Library
  - Euing Collection
- Houghton Library of Harvard University
  - Huth Collection
- Huntington Library
  - Bindley Collection
  - Bridgewater Collection
  - Britwell Collection
- Magdalene College, Cambridge
  - Pepys Ballads
- National Library of Scotland
  - Crawford Collection
  - Rosebery Collection

== Archival Formats ==
In addition to cataloging all of its holdings exhaustively, EBBA archives ballads in up to five different formats, all designed to make the ballads more accessible to modern scholars and members of the public.

=== Ballad Facsimile ===
All ballads are archived on the website as a high quality, 600 dpi image of the ballad sheet, trimmed with a 2mm margin.

=== Album Facsimile ===
Those ballads that were pasted into albums or archived in any format other than loose-leaf are also archived on the website in another high quality photograph of the ballad sheet on its surrounding album page.

=== Transcriptions ===
All ballads, often originally rendered in difficult to read black letter, or Gothic font, and other early modern typefaces, are transcribed into Times New Roman using a diplomatic double-keyed transcription process, and those transcriptions are included in the archive.

=== Facsimile Transcriptions ===
All ballads are archived in Facsimile Transcriptions, in which the original blocks of text from the Ballad Facsimile have been replaced with blocks of text from the modern transcription, resulting in an image that preserves the visual experience of the original ballad, including woodcut impression illustrations, yet is easily readable by a modern audience.

=== Ballad Recording ===
Many broadside ballads include a tune imprint, indicating to which well-known tune they were meant to be sung. For those ballads for which EBBA has been able to identify the tune, recordings of the sung ballad are available on the archive.

== Examples of Notable Holdings ==
- Barbara Allen
- Chevy Chase
- Unexpected Perspectives such as Lady Isabel's Tragedy
- Many Robin Hood Ballads including Robin Hood's Progress to Nottingham
- Examples of the Titus Andronicus tradition

== Bibliography ==
- Patricia Fumerton and Anitta Guerrini, eds. Ballads and Broadsides in Britain, 1500-1800. Burlington, VT: Ashgate Publishing Company, 2010. ISBN 978-0-7546-6248-8
- Patricia Fumerton, ed. Broadside Ballads from the Pepys Collection: A Selection of Texts, Approaches, and Recordings. Tempe, AZ: Arizona Center for Medieval and Renaissance Texts and Studies, 2012. ISBN 978-0-86698-469-0

== See also ==
- List of digital library projects
- English Short Title Catalogue
- EEBO (Early English Books Online)
