= Melisma =

Singing technique

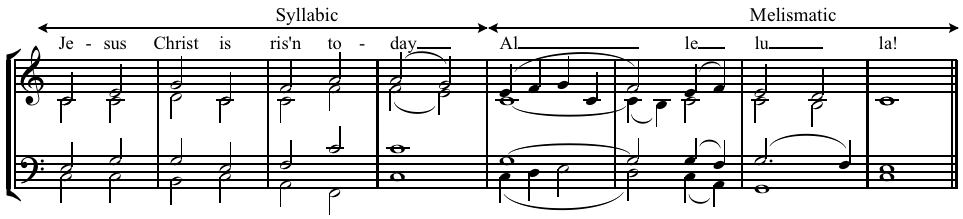
Syllabic and melismatic text setting: "Jesus Christ Is Ris'n Today" (Methodist Hymn Book, 1933, No. 204).

Melisma (Ancient Greek: μέλισμα, mélisma, lit. 'song'; from μέλος, melos, 'song, melody', plural: melísmata), informally known as a vocal run and sometimes interchanged with the term roulade, is the singing of a single syllable of text while moving between several different notes in succession. Music sung in this style is referred to as melismatic, as opposed to syllabic, in which each syllable of text is matched to a single note.

== History ==
=== General ===
The term melisma may be used to describe music of any genre, including baroque singing, opera, and later gospel. Within the tradition of religious Jewish music, melisma is still commonly used in the chanting of Torah, readings from the Prophets, and in the body of a service.

Melisma is prevalent in many forms of Gregorian chant (e.g. Jubilus) as well as late-medieval sacred polyphony, notably in works by Guillaume de Machaut, John Dunstaple, and many early Tudor composers represented in the Eton, Caius, and Lambeth choirbooks.

Today, melisma is commonly used in Middle Eastern music, African music, African-American music, Irish Sean-nós singing, and flamenco. African music infused the blues with melisma. Due to the influences of African-American music, melisma is also commonly featured in Western popular music. The usage of melisma in Gaelic music also commonly appears in early Appalachian music and has been a constant feature of American country and western music since its inception.

=== Prevalence in Western popular music ===
The use of melismatic vocals in Western pop music slowly appeared in the 1980s and grew over the next two decades into a standard by which a singer's skill was judged. For instance, Deniece Williams topped the Billboard Hot 100 chart in May 1984 with her melismatic vocals in "Let's Hear It for the Boy". Although other artists used melisma before her, in the 1990s Whitney Houston's rendition of Dolly Parton's ballad "I Will Always Love You" pushed the technique further into the mainstream. The trend of melismatic vocals in R&B singers is considered to have been popularized by Mariah Carey's song "Vision of Love", which was released and topped the U.S. charts in 1990 and went on to be certified gold. The use of melisma is also a common feature of artists such as Kim Burell, Deniece Williams, Stevie Wonder, Luther Vandross, Whitney Houston, Céline Dion, Mariah Carey, Christina Aguilera, Brandy, and Beyoncé, among others.

As late as 2007, melismatic singers such as Leona Lewis were still scoring big hits, but around 2008–2009, this trend reverted to how it was prior to Carey, Dion, and Houston's success. Singers with less showy styles, such as Kesha and Cheryl Cole, began to outsell new releases by Mariah Carey and Christina Aguilera, ending nearly two decades of the style's dominance in the vocals of Western pop music.

== Examples ==
Angels We Have Heard on High
Chorus of U.S. Army Band, a cappella

The traditional French carol tune to which the hymn "Angels We Have Heard on High" is usually sung (and "Angels from the Realms of Glory" in Great Britain) contains one of the most well-known melismatic sequences in Christian hymn music. Twice in its refrain, the o of the word Gloria is held through 16 different notes.

George Frideric Handel's Messiah contains numerous examples of melisma, as in the following excerpt from the chorus "For Unto Us a Child Is Born" (Part I, No. 12). The soprano and alto lines engage in a 57-note melisma on the word born.

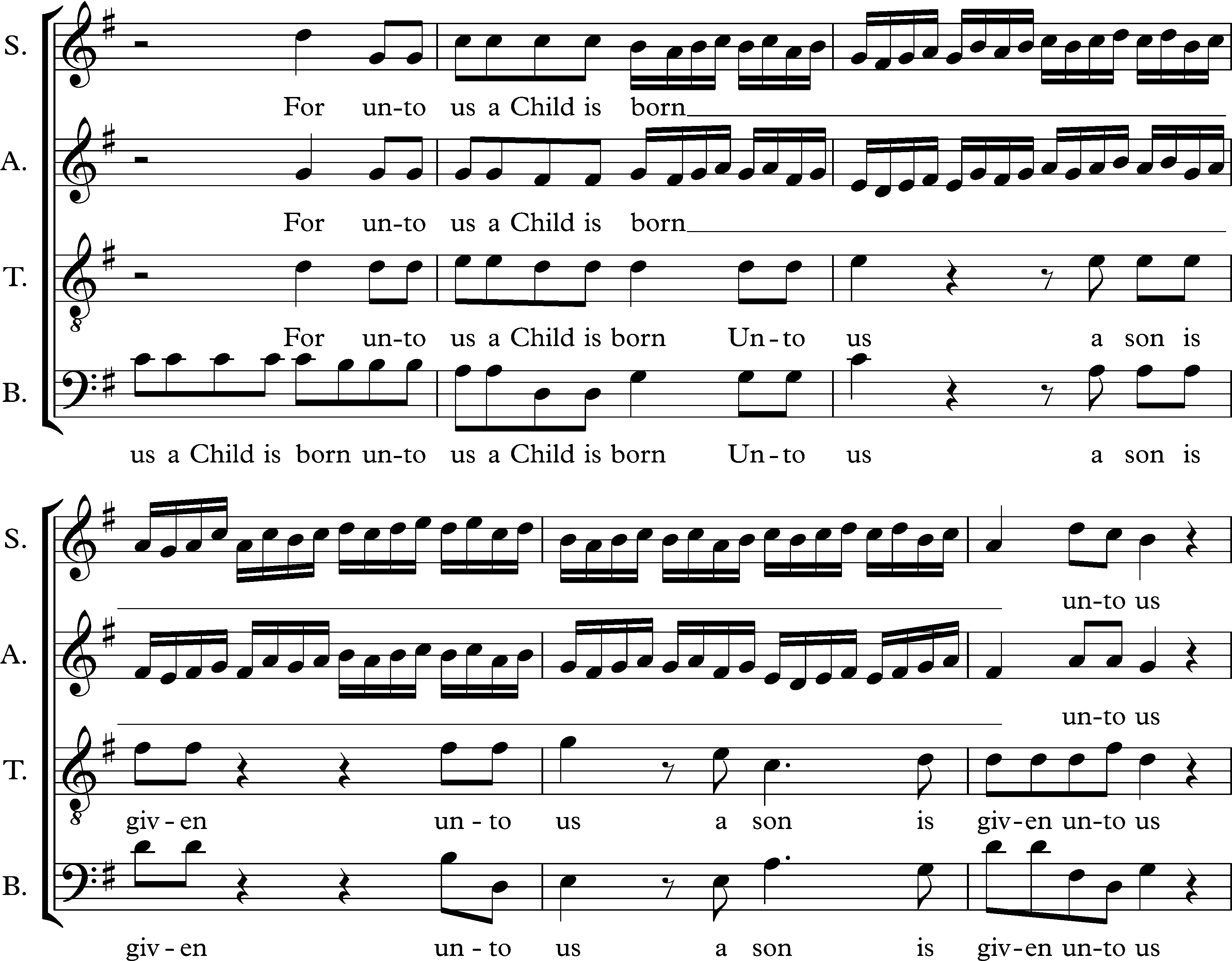

== See also ==
- Arabic maqam
- Coloratura
