= Ritson Manuscript =

15th-century English choirbook

The Ritson Manuscript (London, British Library, Add.5665) is a late fifteenth-century English choirbook, that is a major source for English carols. In addition to 44 carols, it includes three masses, 23 motets, several other sacred pieces, and secular works in English and French. Among the composers represented in the book is Sir William Hawte.

Along with the Pepys Manuscript it is much less elaborate than the Eton, Lambeth and Caius Choirbooks; it contains shorter and simpler pieces which appear to have been written for smaller and less able choirs.

The Ritson Manuscript appears, upon internal evidence, to have been the product of at least five distinct hands. It was compiled over a long period, beginning early in the second half of the fifteenth century and ending in 1510, and originated in the West Country. The Census-Catalogue of Manuscript Sources of Polyphonic Music 1400-1550 suggests it was likely to have been copied at a Franciscan monastery in Devon or possibly Exeter Cathedral.

It was later owned by Joseph Ritson, who in 1795 gave it to the British Museum.

== See also ==
- List of Christmas carols

== Modern studies ==
- C. Miller. A Fifteenth-Century Record of English Choir Repertory: B.M. Add.Ms.5665: a Transcription and Commentary. Dissertation, Yale, 1948.
