= A Collection of Old Ballads =

A Collection of Old Ballads is an anonymous book published 1723–1725 in three volumes in London by Roberts and Leach. It was the second major collection of British folksongs to be published, following Wit and Mirth, or Pills to Purge Melancholy (published 1719–1720). Ambrose Philips was once credited as the editor, but this has since been challenged.

== Contents ==
Volume one contained "Chevy Chase", "Queen Eleanor's Confession", "The Suffolk Miracle", and "Bonny Dundee". The preface to volume two notes that readers had responded to volume one by sending some rare songs to the editor. It has fewer genuine folksongs than the first volume, and instead has some obvious literary concoctions. It has "The Merchant's Son and Beggar Wench of Hull" (a prototype of "New York Girls"), "The Wind Has Blown my Plaid Away", "The Bonny Grey-Eyed Morn" and three Robin Hood ballads. The third volume is the poorest, with long historical songs about the kings of England, obviously not taken from the folk tradition. "The Baffled Knight" (Child Ballad 4) is genuine, and there is even a whaling song "The Greenland Voyage". There are a few Scottish items: "The Broom of Cowdenknowes", "Bessy Bell and Mary Gray", "Muirland Willie" and "The Gaberlunzie Man". The collection also includes "The Merchant and the Beggar Maid" and "An Thou Were My Ain Thing" (later recorded by Maddy Prior).

== Impact ==
Within a year of the publication of volume one, Allan Ramsay was inspired to publish his "Tea-Table Miscellany" (1724) in Edinburgh.

== Lack of tunes to accompany the texts ==
"A Collection of Old Ballads" is the first printed collection to aim for songs that were genuinely old folksongs, but there are no tunes to the 159 texts. In a few cases the names of tunes are indicated.

== Bibliography ==
- British Music Publishers, Printers and Engravers by Frank Kidson (1900)
- The Ballad and the Folk by David Buchan (1972)
- A Ballad History of England by Roy Palmer (1979)
- Victorian Songhunters by E David Gregory (2006)
