= Sympson the Joiner =

British furniture designer

Thomas Simpson, or Sympson the Joiner (fl. 1660s) was a Master-Joiner at the Deptford Dockyard and the Royal Naval Dockyard at Woolwich in London. Samuel Pepys mentions his name several times in his diary.

Pepys' job as a naval administrator brought him into daily contact with the naval dockyards and he was responsible for various aspects of their administration. Although the diary explicitly notes that Pepys was paying him handsomely, it is probable that Simpson was working for Pepys instead of working on the interiors of warships.

In the 17th century, a "joiner" built furniture out of frame-and-panel construction, a refined version of the techniques that were also used to frame up doors and for the panelling of rooms, while a "cabinet-maker" built furniture with flush surfaces suitable for veneers or marquetry, assembled using dovetails. The two trades were quite distinct, and for the fitting out of Royal Navy ships the services of a joiner would have been much more appropriate.

Pepys' diary records that he used Simpson's services on several occasions to work on improvements for his office and his home in Seething Lane, London. For example, on 14 August 1668 he wrote: "At home I find Simpson putting up my new chimney-piece in our great chamber which is very fine, but will cost a great deal of money, but it is not flung away".

Of special interest is the fact that Pepys had Simpson build bookcases, or as Pepys called them 'book presses', for his growing collection of books. These are now preserved at the Pepys Library at Magdalene College in accordance with the stipulations of Pepys's will.

Pepys wrote on 17 August 1667

So took up my wife and home, there I to the office, and thence with Simpson, the joyner home to put together the press he hath brought me for my books this day, which pleases me exceedingly.

and a few days later

and then comes Simpson to set up my other new presses for my books, and so he and I fell into the furnishing of my new closett ... so I think it will be as noble a closett as any man hath.

The surviving book presses have paired glazed doors each in 21 small panes, over a low section, also with glazed panes, made to hold large folio volumes. The doors of the lower section slide up and down, and can be removed completely. The base moldings and cornices are finely and robustly carved with acanthus leaf. Such tall book presses with glazed-panel doors were a contemporary innovation.

Pepys began with one book press and eventually reached twelve as his collection of books grew.
