= The Battle of Otterburn (ballad) =

Scottish child ballad

"The Battle of Otterburn" (or "Otterbourne") is a Scottish ballad, catalogued as Child Ballad 161, Roud 3293. It is an account of the Scottish victory at the Battle of Otterburn in 1388. This battle also inspired "The Ballad of Chevy Chase", an English version, but the Scottish version is more historically accurate.

The lead verse of the ballad is:

It fell about the Lammas tide,
When the muir-men win their hay,
The doughty Earl of Douglas rode
Into England, to catch a prey.

James, 2nd Earl of Douglas, who led the raid, was mortally wounded in this battle, and the ballad represents "My wound is deep, I fain would sleep" as his dying words.

== Versions ==
Child's version A is represented by two manuscript recensions in the British Library. The Aa (MS Cotton Cleopatra C. iv, around 1550) was first printed in Thomas Percy's fourth edition of Reliques of Ancient English Poetry, vol. I (1794), while the Ab (MS Harley 29) appeared in the first edition of Reliques (1765). (the above written and printed versions are the first known).

Version C is Sir Walter Scott's own version printed in Minstrelsy of the Scottish Border (1803), which Child deduced was a composite of four redactions with other insertions.

The Corries sang a truncated version, consisting of the first eight verses down to the fall of Percy, with the title "Lammas Tide".
