= Titus Andronicus (ballad) =

"The Lamentable and Tragical History of Titus Andronicus," also called "Titus Andronicus' Complaint," is a ballad from the 17th century about the fictional Roman general, Titus, and his revenge cycle with the Queen of the Goths. Events in the ballad take place near the end of the Roman Empire, and the narrative of the ballad parallels the plot of William Shakespeare's play Titus Andronicus. Scholarly debate exists as to which text may have existed first, the ballad or the play (indeed, there is a third potential Titus Andronicus source, a prose history published in chapbook form during the 18th century). The ballad itself was first entered on the Stationers' Register in 1594, the same year the play was entered. Surviving copies of the ballad can be found in the British Library, in the Huntington Library, and at Magdalene College, Cambridge. Online copies of the facsimiles are also available for public consumption at sites such as the English Broadside Ballad Archive.

== Synopsis ==
Narrated by Titus Andronicus himself, the ballad begins with Titus addressing "noble Minds, & famous Martial Wights / That in Defense of Native Countries fights" (lines 1-2). Titus thus invokes an audience sympathetic with nationalistic sentiments, and he goes on to explain his victorious return to Rome from wars with the Goths. He describes bringing with him the Queen of the Goths, her two sons, and a Moor as his prisoners; however, upon presenting them to the Emperor of Rome, the Emperor makes the Queen his wife, which enables her and her sons to seek revenge on Titus. Acting in conspiracy with the Moor, the Queen frames Titus's sons for the murder of the Emperor's son, and the Queen's sons rape and mutilate Titus's daughter, Lavinia. After the rape, the Moor manipulates Titus into cutting off his right hand to redeem his sons, but his sons are killed regardless, and their hearts are sent to Titus as a taunt. In an attempt to revenge himself, Titus kills the Queen's sons and, with Lavinia's help, bakes them into a pie to feed to the Queen. In the ballads penultimate stanza, after feeding the pies of her sons' flesh to the Queen, Titus kills Lavinia, the Queen, the Emperor, and eventually himself. The final stanza, still spoken by Titus, documents the Moor's punishment, calling it a just end for all murderers: the Moor was buried into the ground, standing, so that he might starve to death.

== Surviving Copies ==
A number of printed copies of the ballad survive in various special collections: In the British Library, the Roxburghe collection, which houses about 1,500 ballads, possesses a copy of the ballad, estimated to be ca. 1683–1693; the Huntington Library, a much smaller but still significant collection of ballads, has a copy estimated to have been printed somewhere between 1725 and 1769; and the Pepys collection at Magdalene College houses two copies of the ballad, ca. 1684-1686 and 1624.

== Form ==
=== Language ===
On three of the four surviving ballads, the full title is quite long: "The Lamentable and Tragical History of Titus Andronicus; with the Fall of his 25 sons, in the Wars with the Goths, with the manner of the Ravishment of his Daughter Lavinia, by the Empresses two Sons, through the means of a bloody Moor, taken by the sword of Titus, in the War: with his Revenge upon their cruel and inhumane Act." The fourth ballad, from the Pepys collection ca. 1624, is titled only "Titus Andronicus Complaint."

The ballad is mostly composed in iambic pentameter, rather than the traditional ballad meter. The ballad has an AABB rhyme scheme, with thirty quatrains composing the ballad.

=== Music ===
The ballad follows a popular ballad tune from the period, that of 'Fortune my Foe'. Each existing broadside designates 'Fortune my Foe' as the correct tune with a notation just beneath or next to the title of the ballad.

=== Print ===
Like many ballads, the surviving copies in the Roxburghe, Huntington, and Pepys collections are printed on broadside sheets in blackletter, or what we mostly commonly now call gothic, type. Three of the four surviving copies also have a woodcut illustration on the broadside. Like many broadside ballads, the woodcuts are not necessarily tailored to the narrative of the ballad, as woodcuts were often reused by printers.

Of the three surviving woodcuts on the copies of the Titus ballad, only one clearly depicts scenes narrated within the ballad. The ballad facsimile in the Roxburghe collection, for instance, shows a crowd watching a homecoming procession of some kind; however, while a homecoming moment is certainly one Titus narrates, nothing in the woodcut distinctly proves that the homecoming is that of Titus Andronicus. Similarly, the woodcut on the Huntington's broadside facsimile illustrates a scene which is delineated as a moment, not from Titus's tale, but from classical epic. This woodcut portrays a duel between two men, and it labels the two men as Hector and Ajax, both characters from Homer's Iliad. One of the woodcuts from the Pepys collection, however, does depict various scenes that are clearly moments from Titus's narrative. This woodcut illustrates three distinct moments from the ballad: 1. In the foreground, the woodcut depicts Titus killing the Queen's sons and draining their blood into a basin that Lavinia holds. Next to Titus's revenge act, the woodcut shows the Moor to the side as having been half-buried, standing up in the ground. 2. In the background, the woodcut illustrates Lavinia writing the names of her rapists/mutilators in the dirt with a stick balanced between the stumps of her arms. 3. And, in a frame on the right side of the woodcut, the broadside displays the Queen and the Emperor about to eat a pie.
