= Pepys Manuscript =

Historical English choirbook

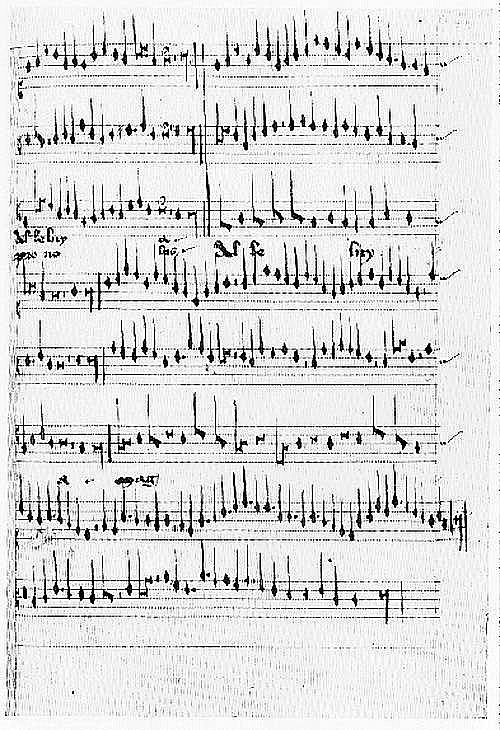
A page from the Pepys Manuscript, showing its notable lack of embellishment

The Pepys Manuscript is a late fifteenth-century English choirbook, in the library of Magdalene College, Cambridge, MS Pepys 1236. Along with the Ritson Manuscript it is much less elaborate than the Eton, Lambeth and Caius Choirbooks; it contains shorter and simpler pieces which appear to have been written for smaller and less able choirs. The book received its name because it was part of the collection owned by Samuel Pepys. He described it as containing "monkish music of Edward IV's time, " but it appears on internal evidence to have been begun a year or two earlier. It was likely completed after 1465, as it contains music ascribed to Sir William Hawte – also referred to as a "Knight" – who was knighted in that year.
