= Selden Carol Book =

Medieval carol manuscript

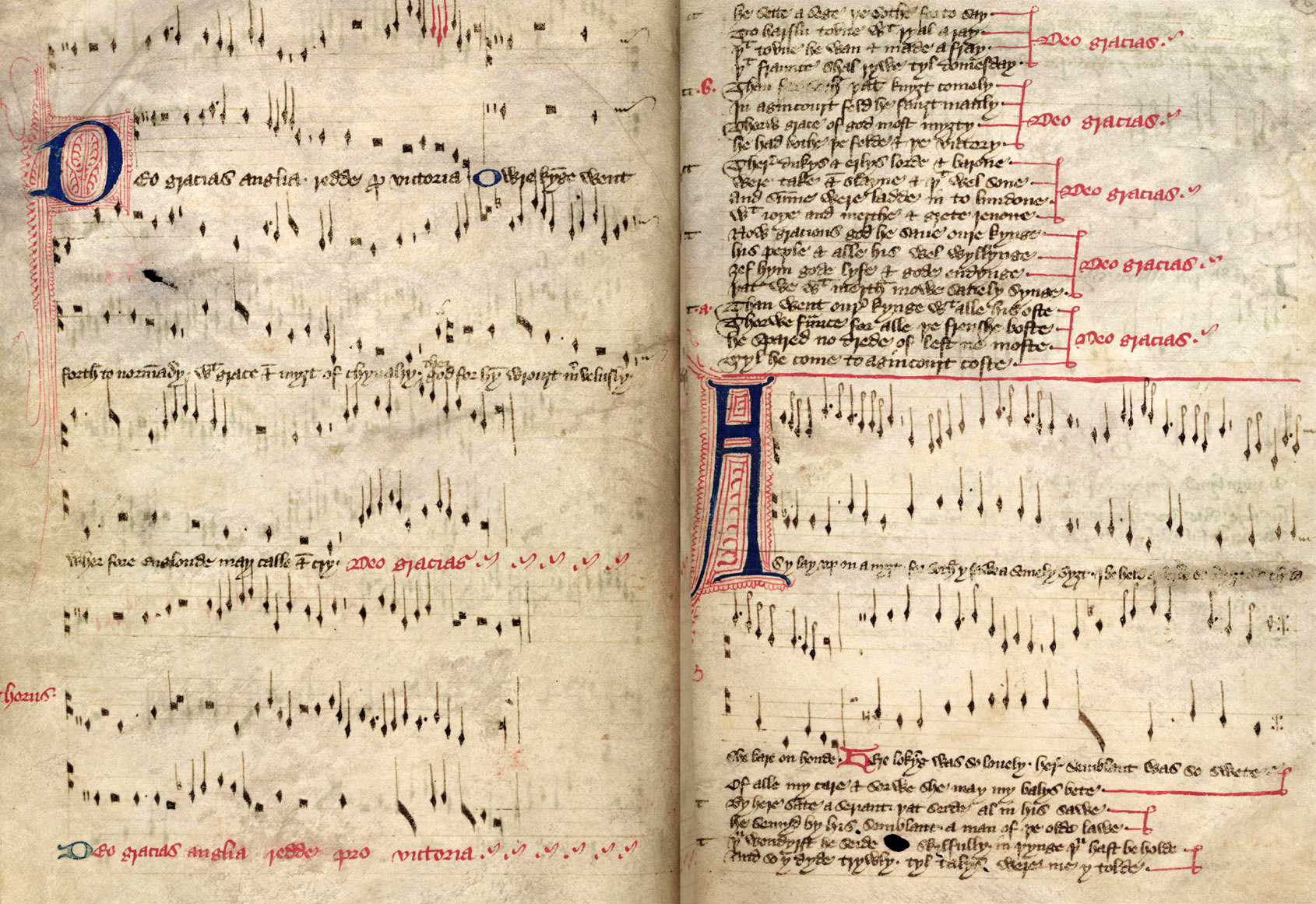
Facsimile of the Selden Carol Book version of the Agincourt Carol (15th century). Oxford, Bodleian Library, Manuscript Archives

The Selden Carol Book is a medieval carol manuscript held by the Bodleian Library in Oxford (MS. Arch. Selden. B. 26). Along with the Trinity Carol Roll, with which it shares five contemporaneous carols and texts (for example the Agincourt Carol), it is one of the main sources for 15th century English carols, and like the Trinity Roll contains the music as the well as the texts. The inclusion of Deo Gracias Anglia referencing Henry V's victory at Agincourt in 1415 gives an indication of the date of composition of the carols.

== Origin ==
The manuscript was part of the extensive bequest of the English jurist, polymath and antiquarian John Selden (1584–1654). Prior to his ownership, it is recorded in the collection of Bishop John Alcock (1430–1500) who was Bishop of Worcester and later Ely. B.26 contains five unrelated manuscripts which were bound together into a single volume about 1660; the musical section of the manuscript of 31 leaves known as the Selden Carol Book dates from the second quarter of the fifteenth century and contains songs and polyphony in Latin and Middle English, with some of the carols alternating between the two, a common form for carols of the period known as macaronic.

Dr Richard L Greene in The Early English Carols and Thomas Gibson Duncan in A Companion to the Middle English Lyric associate the book with the priory at Worcester, now Worcester Cathedral. Greene states that Worcester was "a house where there was much carolling" and accounts for Christmas entertainments suggest new songs and carols introduced by visitors were written down for future performance, with the prior employing a scribe to perform this task on Christmas Day. Census-Catalogue of Manuscript Sources of Polyphonic Music 1400-1550 also suggests Worcester, but adds that it may have been copied there for St. Mary Newarke College, a now-lost collegiate church in Leicester.

== Description ==
The Census-Catalogue of Manuscript Sources of Polyphonic Music 1400-1550 estimates that the work was copied by two main scribes with additional material copied by eight to ten additional hands. Timothy Glover concludes that while it was created at a monastery, the two secular drinking songs at the end of the manuscript suggests it was unlikely to have been used in a liturgical setting. In addition, the elaborate initials and line space decoration would suggest it was not used for performance purposes.

The carols are noted in mensural notation on staves. The beginning of each song is marked by decorative initials in blue ink with red adornments. The text is handwritten in the Cursiva Anglicana script of the period, a form of writing initially used for letters and legal documents which soon became the most commonly used script for copying English literary texts of the period, for example the manuscripts of Geoffrey Chaucer and William Langland. The 'burdens', a type of refrain performed at the beginning of the song and between verses, are the earliest example of a carol manuscript explicitly directing what it now known as a 'chorus'. The incorporation of Latin phrases from the liturgy of the Catholic Church feature in many of the burdens – as all church services were conducted in Latin, even non-speakers would have been familiar with their meaning.

== Contents ==
There are thirty carols and songs with music in the manuscript, plus a few marginalia fragments.

Number	First line	Burden	Notes
1	Holy Writ sayeth which no thing is soother	I pray yow all wyth o thowght / Amende me and peyre me nowght	
2	Exortum est in love and liss	Nowel syng we bothe al and som / Now Rex Pacificus ys ycome	Christmas carol
3	Man have in mind how here before	Man assay assay assay / and aske mercy quyls þat þu may	
4	Good day Sir Christmas our King / for every man	Go day go day / My lord syre cristemasse go day	Christmas carol
5	This rose is railed on a rise	Off a rose synge we / Misterium mirabile	Marian song
6	Now well may me mirths make	Letabundus exultet fidelys chorus Alleluia	Macaronic Christmas carol
7	Holy Maiden blessed Thou be / Gods son is born of Thee	Synge we to this mery cumpane / Regina celi letare	Marian song
8	As I lay upon a night	Now syng we all in fere / Alma redemptoris mater	Carol of the Annunciation
9	Worship be the birth of thee	Ave domina / Celi regina	Macaronic carol of the Nativity
10	Out of your sleep arise and wake	Nowel nowel nowel nowel nowel nowel	Christmas carol
11	A patre unigenitus	Make we ioye nowe in this fest / In quo Cristus natus est / Eya	Macaronic carol of the Nativity
12	A babe is born of high nature / The Prince of peace	Qwat tydynges bryngyst þu massager / Of cristys berthe þis ȝolys day	A New Year carol
13	Our king went forth to Normandy	Deo gracias Anglia / Redde pro victoria	The Agincourt Carol
14	As I lay upon a night		A song of the Virgin Mary and Joseph
15	I-blessed be Christs sonde	The Merthe of alle þis londe / maketh þe gode husbonde / wiþ eringe of his plowe	Prayer for a good harvest ("God spede the plowe alle way")
16	Glad and blithe mote ye be		A macaronic Nativity song
17	A new work is come on hand	Alleluya	Carol of the Nativity
18	The holy ghost is to thee sent	Hayl mary ful of grace / Moder in virginite	Annunciation carol
19	Hail blessed Lady which has born / God Son		Marian hymn
20	This is the song that ye shall hear	An heuenly songe y dare wel say / Is sunge in erthe to man this day	Nativity carol
21	Lo Moses bush shining unbrent	Hayl godys sone in trinite / Te secund in diuinite / Thy moder is a may	Marian hymn
22	Fetys bel chere / Drink to thy fere		Macaronic drinking song in Latin, English, and French
23	Thou holy daughter of Sion	Nouus sol de virgine / Reluxit nobis hodie	Carol to the Virgin Mary
24	Hail blessed Flower of virginity	Ave Maria	Carol to the Virgin Mary
25	In Bethlehem this bird of life	Nowel nowel nowel / To vs is born owr god emanuel	Christmas carol
26	A song to sing I have good right	Laus, honor, virtus, gloria / Et tibi decus Maria	Macaronic Nativity carol
27	That lord that lay in an ass stall	Iblessid be þat lord in mageste / Qui natus fuit hodie	Christmas carol
28	This world wondereth of all thing	Veni redemptor gencium / veni redemptor gencium	Carol of the Incarnation
29	Abide I hope it be the best	Abyde Y hope hit be the beste / Sith hasty man lakked neuer woo	Moral song
30	Tapster fill another ale		Drinking catch for three voices
31	Welcome be ye when ye go		Satirical verses about a woman "his mistress" (no music)
32	If thou flee idleness	Ouidius de remedio amoris	(no music)

== See also ==
- List of Christmas carols
