= Reliques of Ancient English Poetry =

1765 ballad anthology by Thomas Percy

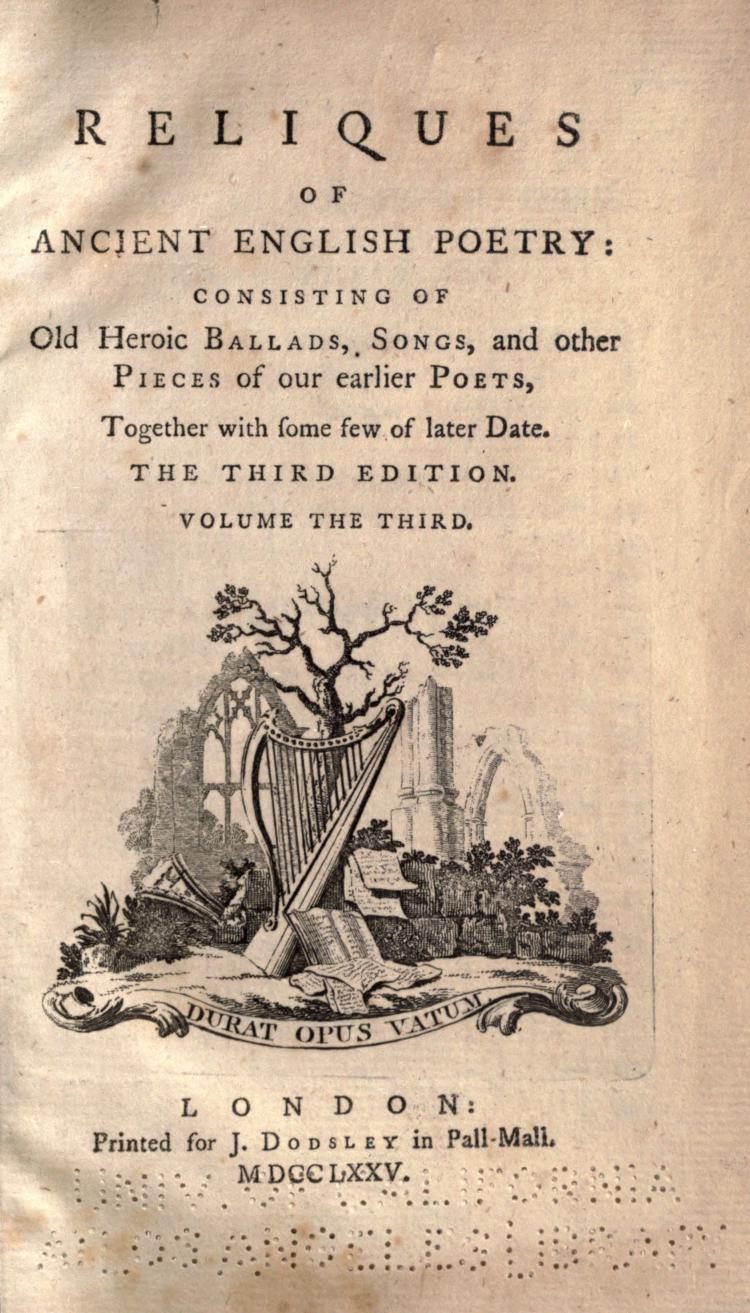
Title page of the third edition of Reliques of Ancient English Poetry (1775).

The Reliques of Ancient English Poetry (sometimes known as Reliques of Ancient Poetry or simply Percy's Reliques) is a collection of ballads and popular songs collected by Bishop Thomas Percy and published in 1765.

== Sources ==
The basis of the work was the manuscript which became known as the Percy Folio. Percy found the folio in the house of his friend Humphrey Pitt at Shifnal, a small market town of Shropshire. It was on the floor, and Pitt's maid had been using the leaves to light fires. Once rescued, Percy would use just forty-five of the ballads in the folio for his book, despite claiming the bulk of the collection came from this folio. Other sources were the Pepys Library of broadside ballads collected by Samuel Pepys and Collection of Old Ballads published in 1723, possibly by Ambrose Philips. Bishop Percy was encouraged to publish the work by his friends Samuel Johnson and the poet William Shenstone, who also found and contributed ballads.

Percy did not treat the folio nor the texts in it with the scrupulous care expected of a modern editor of manuscripts. He wrote his own notes directly on the folio pages, emended the rhymes and even pulled pages out of the document to give to the printer without making copies. He was criticised for these actions even at the time, most notably by Joseph Ritson, a fellow antiquary. The folio he worked from seems to have been written by a single copyist and errors such as pan and wale for wan and pale needed correcting.

== Content ==
The Reliques contained one hundred and eighty ballads in three volumes with three sections in each. It contains such important ballads as "The Ballad of Chevy Chase", "The Battle of Otterburn", "Lillibullero", "The Dragon of Wantley", "The Nut-Brown Maid" and "Sir Patrick Spens" along with ballads mentioned by or possibly inspiring Shakespeare, several ballads about Robin Hood and one of the Wandering Jew.

The claim that the book contained samples of ancient poetry was only partially correct. The last part of each volume was given over to more contemporary works—often less than a hundred years old—included to stress the continuing tradition of the balladeer. The collection draws on the Folio and on other manuscript and printed sources, but in at least three cases anonymous informants, "ladies" in each case, contributed oral poetry known to them. He made substantial amendments to the Folio text in collaboration with his friend the poet William Shenstone.

The work was dedicated to Elizabeth Seymour, Duchess of Northumberland, who was married to Hugh Percy, 1st Duke of Northumberland. Elizabeth was part of the Percy family and a descendant of Henry Percy, a protagonist of some of the early ballads. Bishop Thomas Percy also claimed to be connected to the family and although this may have been fanciful on his part, it did seem to help him secure his preferment.

The dedication to the duchess meant that Thomas Percy arranged the work to give prominence to the border ballads which were composed in and about the Scottish and English borders, specifically Northumberland, home county of the Percies. Percy also omitted some of the racier ballads from the Folio for fear of offending his noble patron: these were first published by F. J. Furnivall in 1868.

== Reception ==
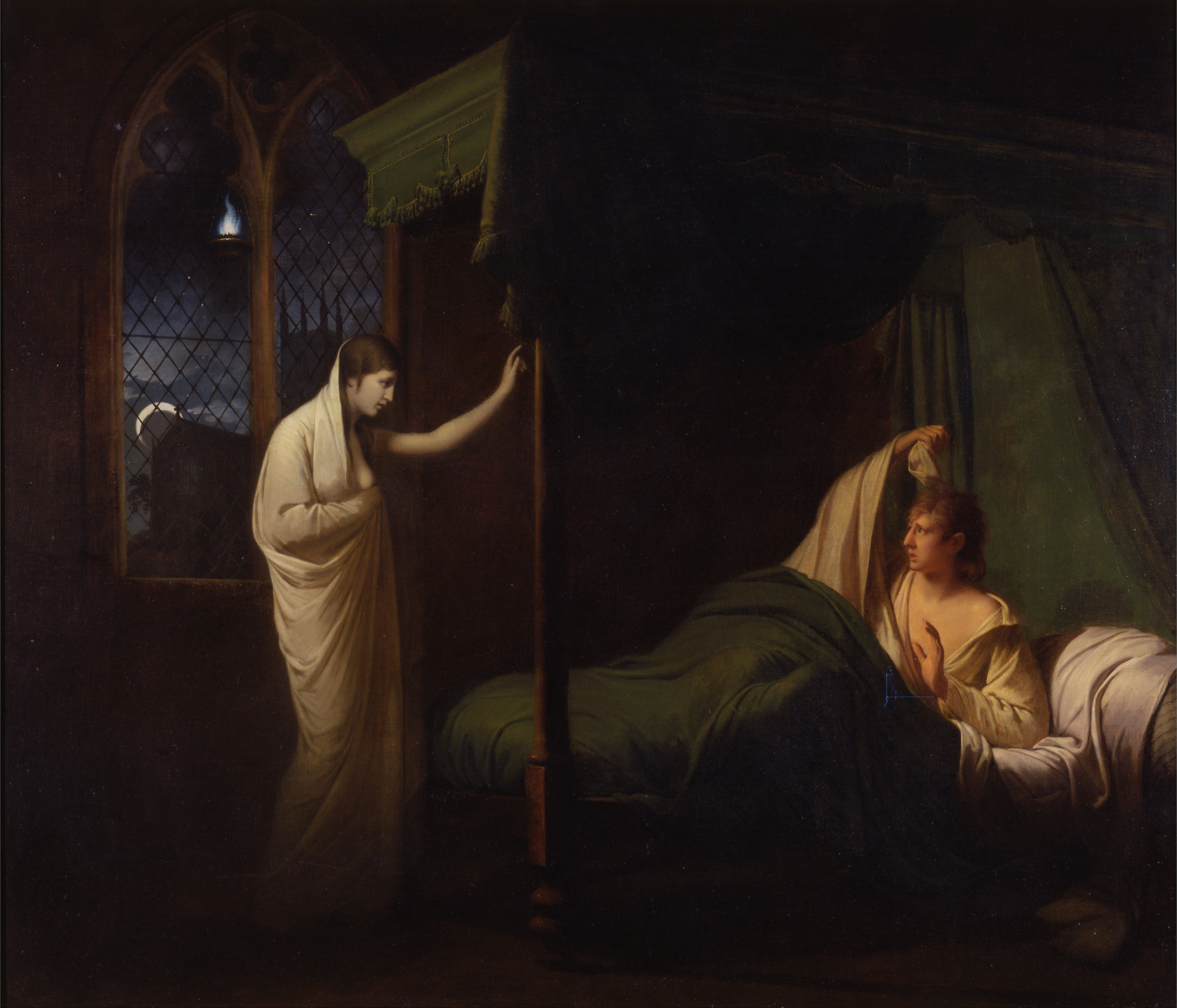
Joseph Wright of Derby – William and Margaret from Percy's Reliques of Ancient English Poetry, c. 1785

Ballad collections had appeared before but Percy's Reliques seemed to capture the public imagination like no other. Not only would it inspire poets such as Samuel Taylor Coleridge and William Wordsworth to compose their own literary ballads in imitation, it also made the collecting and study of oral poetry a popular pastime. Sir Walter Scott was another writer inspired by reading the Reliques in his youth, and he published some of the ballads he collected in Minstrelsy of the Scottish Border. The more rigorous scholarship of folklorists would eventually supersede Percy's work, most notably in Francis James Child's Child Ballads, but Percy gave impetus to the whole subject.

The book is also credited, in part, with changing the prevailing literary movement of the 18th century, Neo-Classicism, into Romanticism. The classicist Augustans took as their model the epic hexameters of Virgil's Aeneid and the blank verse of John Milton's three epics. The Reliques highlighted the traditions and folklore of England seen as simpler and less artificial. It would inspire folklore collectors and movements in other parts of Europe and beyond, such as the Brothers Grimm in French-occupied Westphalia and Hesse, and such movements would act as the foundation of romantic nationalism. The Percy Society was founded in 1840 to continue the work of publishing rare ballads, poems and early texts.
