= The Suffolk Miracle =

Traditional song

The Suffolk Miracle is Child Ballad 272 and is listed as #246 in the Roud Folk Song Index. Versions of the ballad have been collected from traditional singers in England, Ireland and North America. The song is also known as "The Holland Handkerchief" and sometimes as "The Lover's Ghost".

== Synopsis ==
A young woman from a wealthy or land-owning family comes to love a young commoner, so her father sends her away. While in exile, the maid wakes one night to find her lover at her window mounted upon a fine horse. They go out riding together until the man complains he has a headache; the maid tends to him and ties her handkerchief around his head. She returns to her father, who gives her the news that her young lover has in fact died of grief, whereupon she goes to his grave and digs up the bones, finding that her handkerchief is tied round the skull. In broadside versions she dies of grief shortly afterwards.

== Words ==
The Lover's Ghost

It's of a farmer in our town,
His election goes the country round;
He had a daughter, a beauty bright,
In every place was her heart's delight.

Many a young man a-courting came,
But none of them would her favour gain,
Till a young man came, of low degree,
Came underhanded and she fancied he.

Soon as her father came this to hear,
He separated her from her dear,
For four score miles this maid was sent,
To her uncle's home for his discontent.

Nine days after this young man died,
And his ghost appeared at her bedside -
"Rise, rise, my love and come with me,
And break these chains and set me free."

This maid arose and got up behind,
And he drove as swift as the very wind,
And not a word did this young man speak,
But - "My dearest dear, how my head does ache!"

She had a handkerchief of the holland kind,
And around his head she did him bind;
She kissed his pale lips, and thus did say -
"My dearest dear, you're as cold as clay."

He drove her up to her father's door,
And saw her father standing on the floor -
"O father dear, did you send for me
By such a kind messenger, kind sir?" said she.

He wrung his hands and tore his hair,
Much like a man in deep despair;
He tore the hair all from his head,
Crying - "Daughter dear, the young man is dead."

Early next morning this maid arose,
And straightaway to the churchyard goes,
She rose the corpse that was nine day's dead,
And found her handkerchief bound round his head.

O parents, parents, a warning take,
Don't chide your children, for heaven's sake!
Don't chide your children, for heaven's sake,
Or you'll repent when it is too late.

Collected from Richard May by Alfred Williams, Fairford, Gloucestershire, early 20th century.

== History ==
=== Early printed examples ===
The Suffolk Miracle was first published by broadside printers between 1678 and 1680, and the latest known broadside was published between 1711 and 1769. It was included in the first volume of A Collection of Old Ballads, compiled by Ambrose Philips and published in London in 1723.

=== Collection history ===
The Roud Folk Song Index lists about 39 instances collected from traditional singers – 23 from the United States, 9 from Ireland, 4 from Canada and 3 from England. The earliest dated English version was collected in 1907, and several American versions were collected by Cecil Sharp in 1916.

=== Field recordings ===
Some field recordings are available to listen online.

- Austin Flanagan was recorded singing this ballad in 1974.
- Packie Manus Byrne was recorded the song as The Holland Handkerchief in 1974. It is issued on The Voice of the People Vol 3.
- Tom Lenihan was recorded singing The Holland Handkerchief at Knockbrack, Miltown Malbay in 1976.
- Michael McGonigle was recorded singing The Holland Handkerchief at the Brass Rail Bar, Buncrana, Co. Donegal, in 1988.
- Mary Ann Canny was recorded singing The Holland Handkerchief at Dunaff, Co. Donegal on an unknown date.
- Susan Waters sings a version, collected by Derek Piotr

== Versions ==
Jim Moray recorded a version of this song on his album Sweet England. Other versions have been recorded by John Goodluck, Ken Hall and Peta Webb, Norma Waterson, Kerfuffle, Benji Kirkpatrick, and Rosie Hood.

== Discussion ==
Child included this ballad in "The English and Scottish Popular Ballads" because he thought it was derived from a traditional story from Europe:

This piece could not be admitted here on its own merits. At the first look, it would be classed with the vulgar prodigies printed for hawkers to sell and for Mopsa and Dorcas to buy........I have printed this ballad because, in a blurred, enfeebled, and disfigured shape, it is representative in England of one of the most remarkable tales and one of the most impressive and beautiful ballads of the European continent.

== See also ==
- List of the Child Ballads
- Vanishing hitchhiker
