= Agincourt Carol =

15th-century English folk song

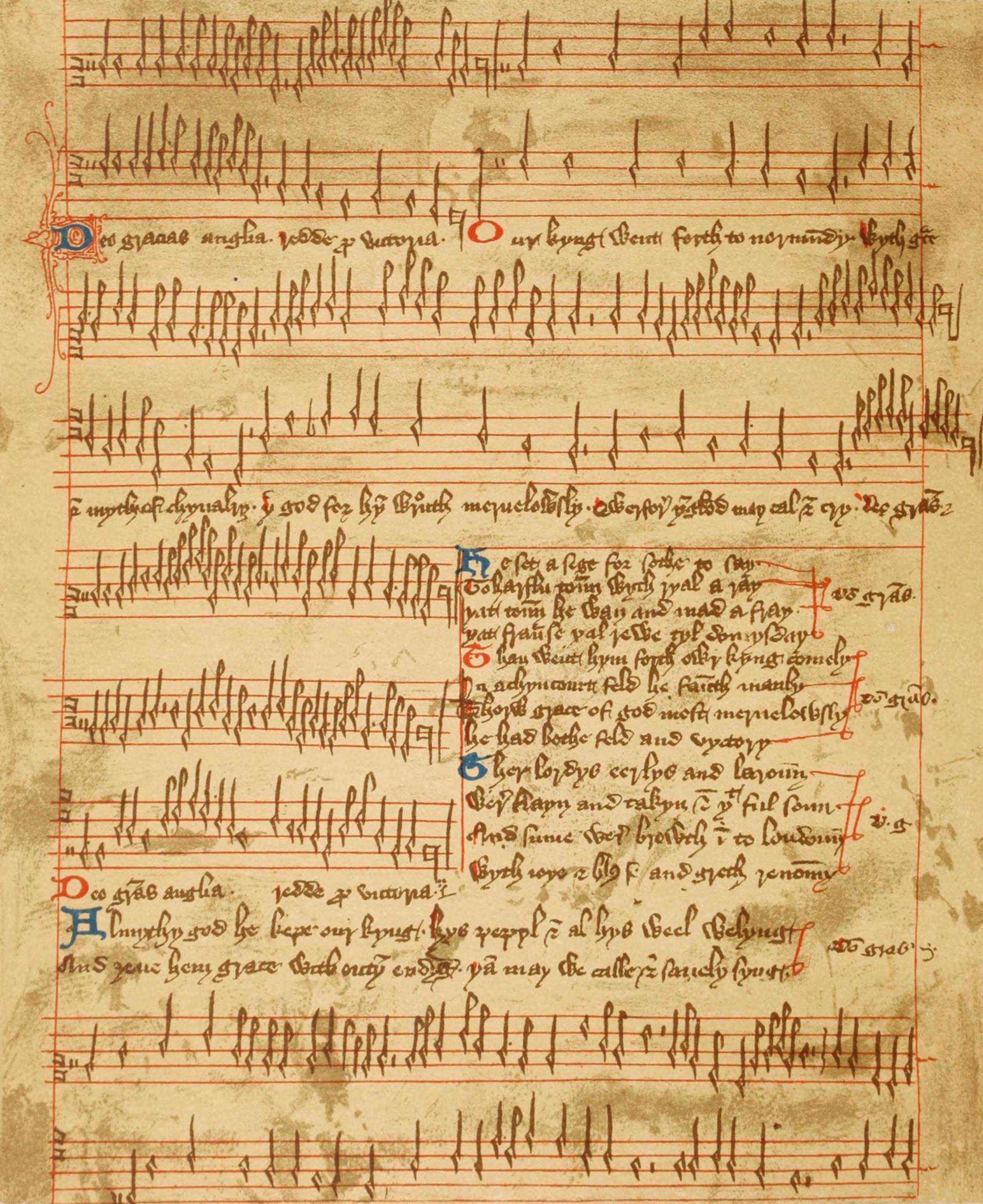
Facsimile of the "Agincourt Carol" in the Trinity Carol Roll (Trinity MS O.3.58)

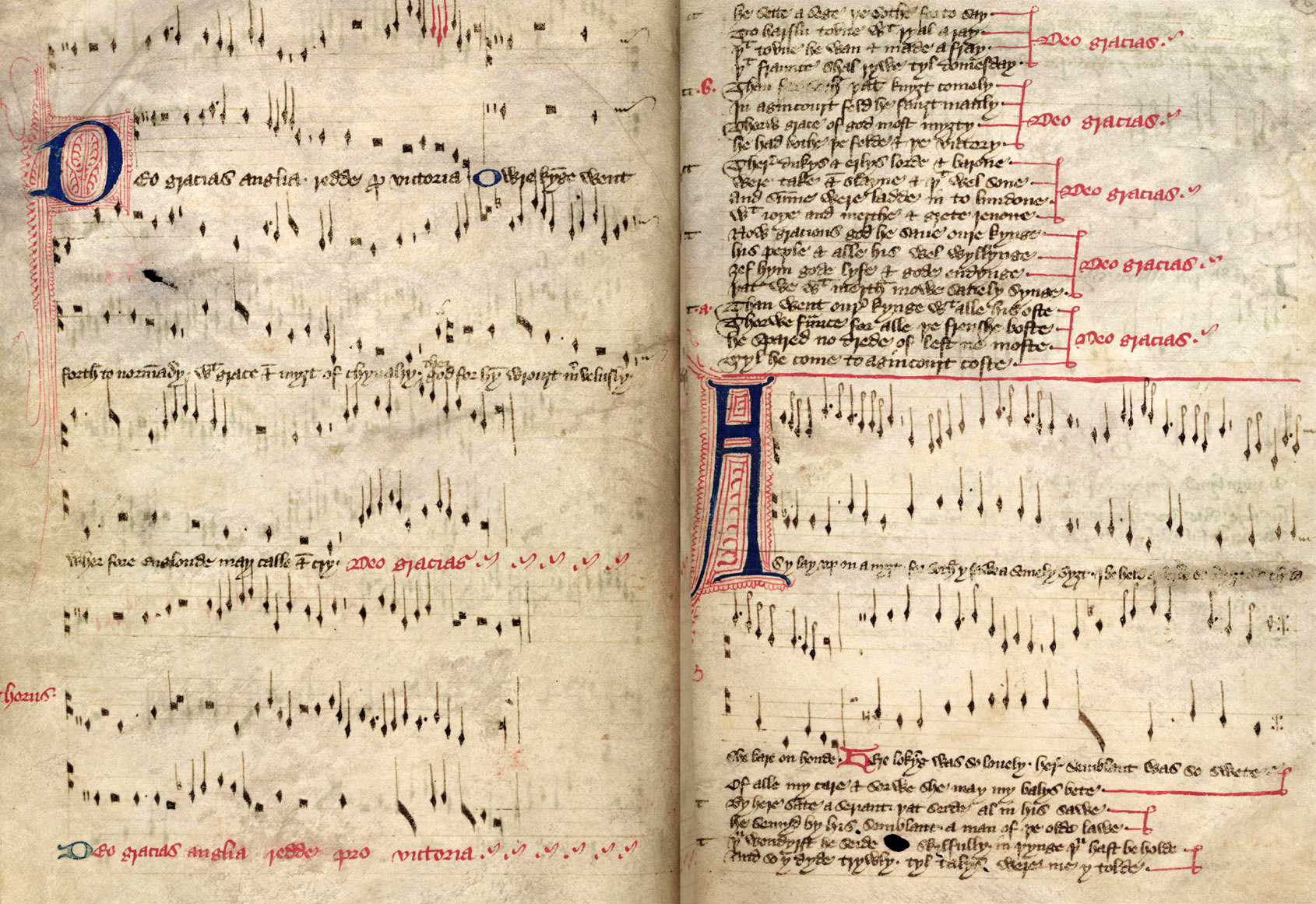
Facsimile of the Selden Carol Book version of the "Agincourt Carol" (15th century). Oxford, Bodleian Library, Manuscript Archives

The "Agincourt Carol" (sometimes known as the Agincourt Song, the Agincourt Hymn, or by its chorus and central words, Deo gratias Anglia) is an English folk song written some time in the early 15th century. It recounts the 1415 Battle of Agincourt, in which the English army led by Henry V of England defeated that of the French Charles VI in what is now the Pas-de-Calais region of France.

The carol is one of thirteen on the Trinity Carol Roll, probably originating in East Anglia, that has been held in the Wren Library of Trinity College, Cambridge, since the 19th century. The other primary source for the carol is the contemporaneous Selden Carol Book held by the Bodleian Library in Oxford.

The carol is featured in Laurence Olivier's 1944 film Henry V. The composer Ernest Farrar created his 1918 Heroic Elegy: For Soldiers on the basis of the Agincourt Carol.

== Lyrics ==
Deo gratias Anglia redde pro victoria!
[Give thanks, England, to God for victory!]

Owre Kynge went forth to Normandy
With grace and myght of chyvalry
Ther God for hym wrought mervelusly;
Wherefore Englonde may call and cry

Chorus
Deo gratias!
Deo gratias Anglia redde pro victoria!

He sette sege, forsothe to say,
To Harflu towne with ryal aray;
That toune he wan and made afray
That Fraunce shal rewe tyl domesday.

Chorus

Then went owre kynge, with alle his oste
Thorowe Fraunce for all the Frenshe boste;
He spared 'for' drede of leste, ne most
Tyl he come to Agincourt coste.

Chorus

Then went hym forth, owre king comely,
In Agincourt feld he faught manly;
Throw grace of God most marvelously,
He had both feld and victory.

Chorus

Ther lordys, erles and barone
Were slayne and taken and that full soon,
Ans summe were broght into Lundone
With joye and blisse and gret renone.

Chorus

Almighty God he keep owre kynge,
His people, and alle his well-wyllynge,
And give them grace wythoute endyng;
Then may we call and savely syng:

Chorus

The pattern of a strophe (verse) sung in English followed by a burden (chorus) in Latin followed a structure typical of the religious carols of the period.

The Agincourt Carol has been recorded by several choirs and bands, among others The Young Tradition on Galleries, (with both the Early Music Consort and Dave Swarbrick contributing), the Poxy Boggards on their first recording Bawdy Parts, and by the Silly Sisters (band) (Maddy Prior and June Tabor) on their second album No More to the Dance.
