= The Ballad of Chevy Chase =

Traditional English ballad

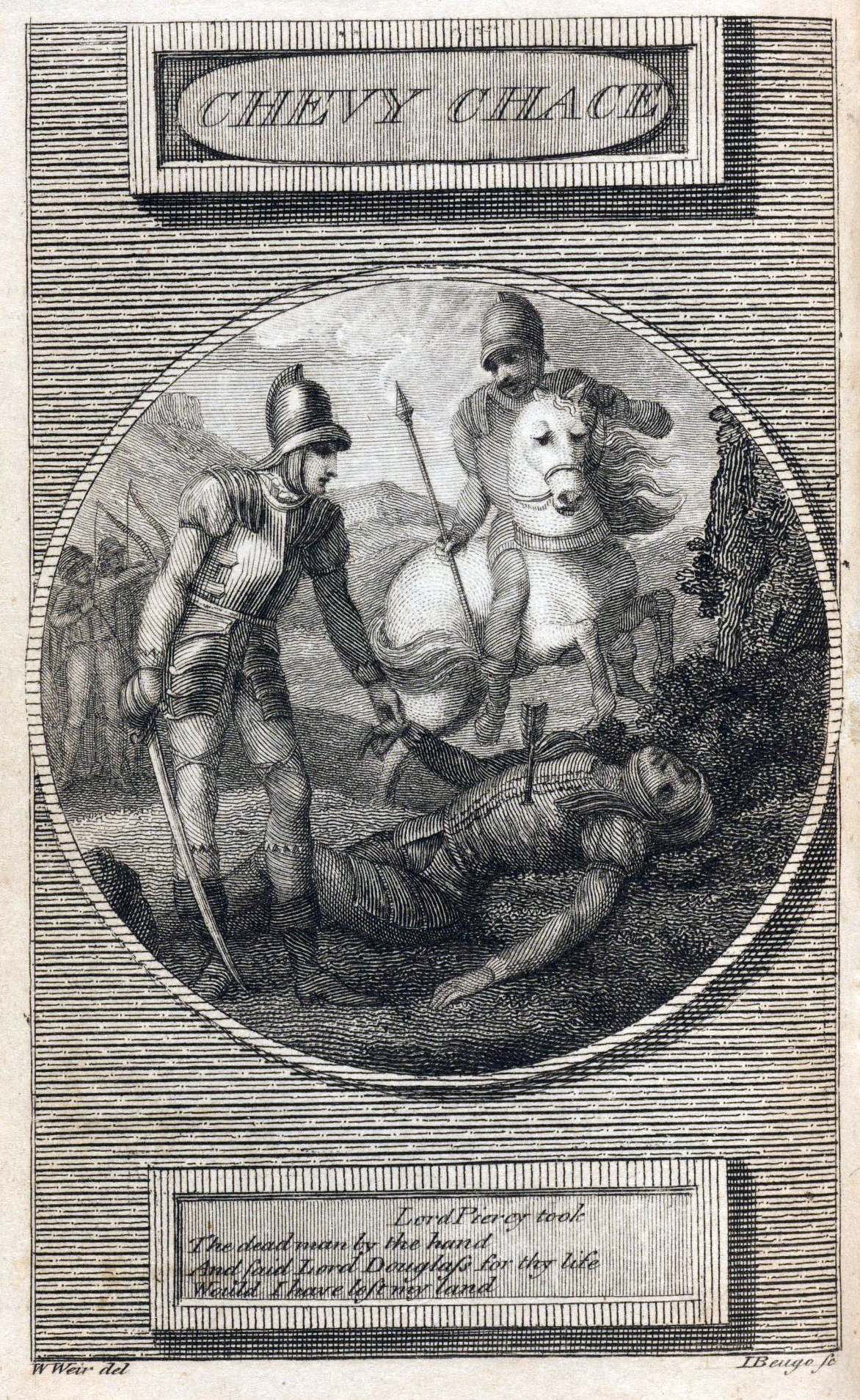
Copperplate illustration for 1790 edition

"The Ballad of Chevy Chase" is an English ballad, catalogued as Child Ballad 162 (Roud 223). There are two extant ballads under this title, both of which narrate the same story. As ballads existed within oral tradition before being written down, other versions of this once-popular song also may have existed. Its tune has been used by other, unconnected songs.

It is about a bloody battle on a parcel of hunting land (or chase) in the Cheviot Hills—hence, "Chevy Chase".

== Synopsis ==
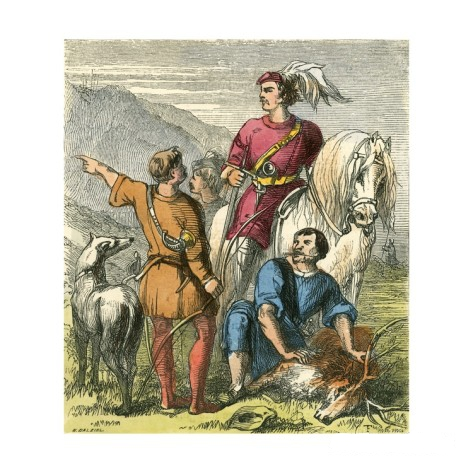
Earl Percy hunting in Chevy Chase. Illustration by F. Tayler.

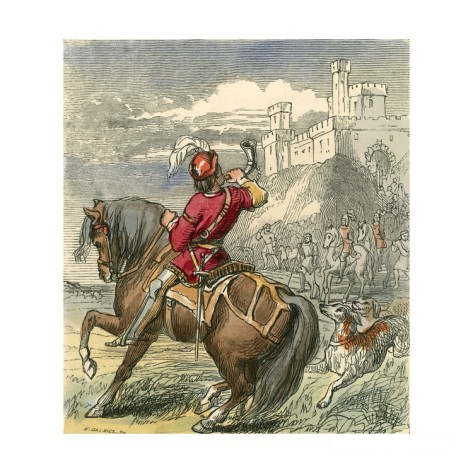
Earl Douglas advancing with his men. Illustration by F. Tayler.

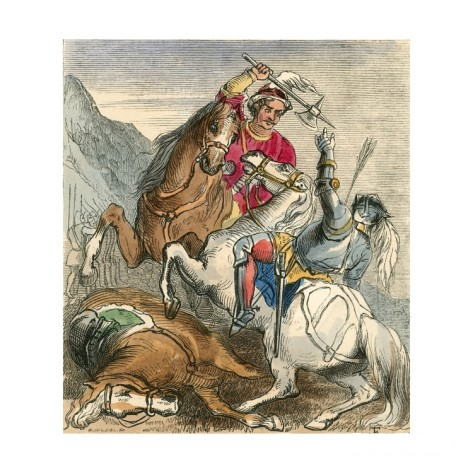
The death of Earl Douglas. Illustration by F. Tayler.

The ballads tell the story of a large hunting party upon a parcel of hunting land (or chase) in the Cheviot Hills, a range of rolling hills straddling the Anglo-Scottish border between Northumberland and the Scottish Borders—hence, "Chevy Chase". The hunt is led by Percy, the English Earl of Northumberland, against the wishes of the Scottish Earl Douglas, who had forbidden it. Douglas interprets the party's arrival as an invasion of Scotland and attacks. Only 110 people survive the bloody battle that follows.

== Historical basis ==
Thomas Percy and scholar Francis J. Child noted similarities with the older "The Battle of Otterburn", about the 1388 Battle of Otterburn. Neither set of lyrics is completely historically accurate. Versions of either ballad often contain parallel biographical and historical information; nonetheless, the differences led Child to believe that they did not originally refer to the same occurrence.

Simpson suggests that the music of "Chevy Chase" was identical to the tune of "Flying Flame", in which the former superseded the latter by the beginning of the seventeenth century.

Both ballads were collected in Thomas Percy's Reliques. The first of the ballads is in Francis James Child's English and Scottish Popular Ballads. Different versions were collected in England, Scotland, and the United States.

Versions of "The Ballad of Chevy Chase" exist in several ballad collections, including the Roxburghe Ballads, the Pepys Library, the Huntington Library Miscellaneous, the Glasgow University Library, and the Crawford Collection at the National Library of Scotland. The ballads in these collections were printed with variations between 1623 and 1760. Online facsimiles of the ballad are also available for public consumption at the English Broadside Ballad Archive and other online repositories.

== First ballad ==
The first of the two ballads of Chevy Chase may have been written as early as the 1430s, but the earliest record we have of it is in The Complaynt of Scotland, printed c. 1549. One of the first printed books in Middle Scots, the book calls the ballad The Hunting of Cheviot.

The first manuscript version of the ballad was written c. 1550 (MS Ashmole 48, Bodleian Library).

In the seventeenth century, the tune was licensed in 1624 and again in 1675.

== Second ballad ==
In 1711, Joseph Addison wrote in The Spectator:

The old song of "Chevy-Chase" is the favourite ballad of the common people of England, and Ben Jonson used to say he had rather have been the author of it than of all his works. Sir Philip Sidney, in his discourse of Poetry [The Defence of Poesie], speaks of it in the following words: "I never heard the old song of Percy and Douglas that I found not my heart more moved than with a trumpet; and yet it is sung by some blind crowder with no rougher voice than rude style, which being so evil apparelled in the dust and cobweb of that uncivil age, what would it work trimmed in the gorgeous eloquence of Pindar?" For my own part, I am so professed an admirer of this antiquated song, that I shall give my reader a critique upon it without any further apology for so doing.

Apparently, Addison was unaware that the ballad, which he proceeded to analyze in detail, was not the same work praised by Sidney and Jonson. The second of the ballads appears to have been written in modernized English some years after Sidney's comments, perhaps c. 1620, and to have become the better-known version.

== Cultural references ==
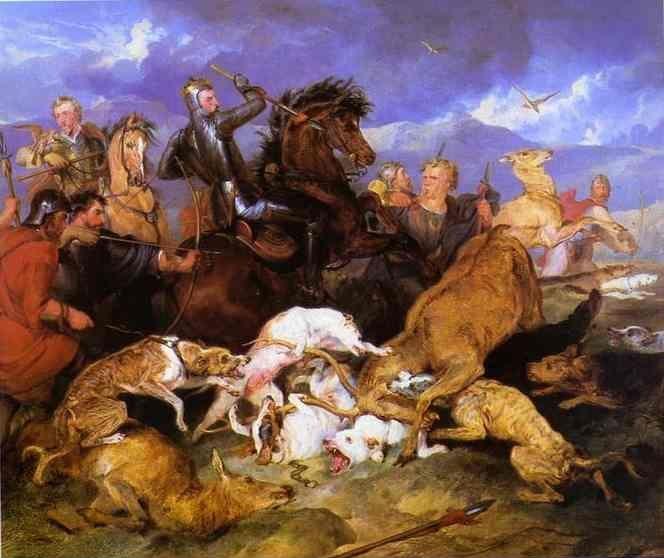
The Hunting of Chevy Chase (1825–26) by Edwin Landseer

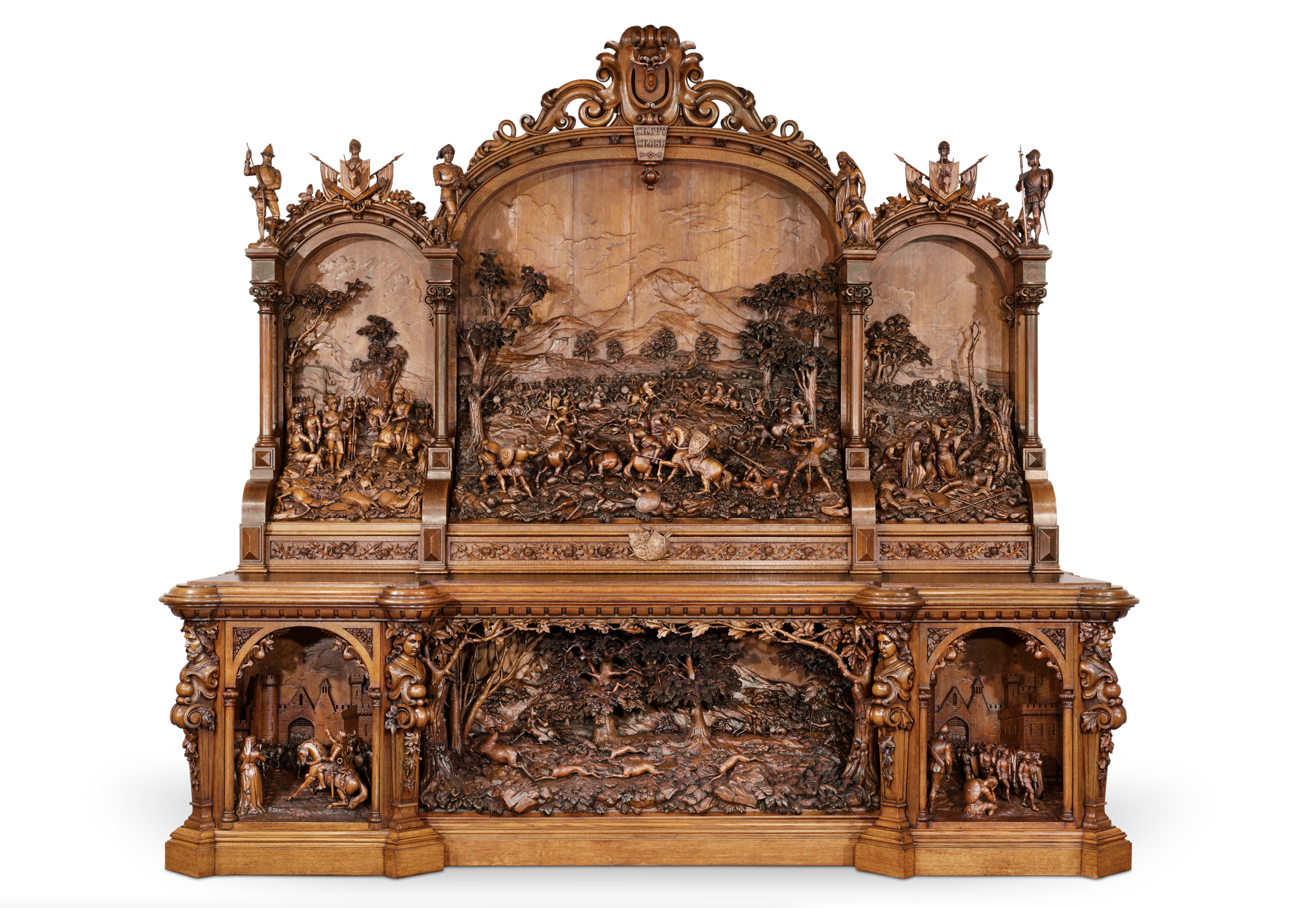
The Chevy Chase Sideboard by Gerrard Robinson (1834–1891).

William Hutton, in A Journey from Birmingham to London (1785), mentions "the old song of Chevy Chace" and its tale about "the animosity between England and Scotland".

In Sir Walter Scott's Rob Roy (1817), the main character, Frank, upon seeing the trophies on the walls of Osbaldistone hall, imagines them being from the Chevy Chase.

An early and popular painting of 1825–26 by Edwin Landseer was titled The Hunting of Chevy Chase.

In Emily Brontë's Wuthering Heights (1847), Catherine Heathcliff (née Catherine Linton) scorns Hareton Earnshaw's primitive attempts at reading, saying, "I wish you would repeat Chevy Chase as you did yesterday; it was extremely funny!"

In Elizabeth Gaskell's North and South (1855), on hearing the conversation between Mr. Thornton and her father, Margaret Hale wonders, “How in the world had they got from cog-wheels to Chevy Chace?”

In F. Anstey's Vice Versa (1882), the boys at Dr. Grimstone's boarding school are required to play a game called "chevy" (a version of "prisoners' base" or "darebase"), "so called from the engagement famed in ballad and history".

== Legacy ==
A tract of land in British America was named "Cheivy Chace" by 1725, and was in the 1890s and early 1900s developed into the affluent areas of Chevy Chase, Maryland, and Chevy Chase, Washington, D.C. A golf club in the Maryland Chevy Chase inspired the name of Chevy Chase, Lexington, Kentucky.

A shopping mall in the Eldon Square Shopping Centre in Newcastle upon Tyne is named "Chevy Chase" in allusion to the ballad.

The ballad inspired the childhood nickname and adult stage name of the American comedian and actor Chevy Chase (born Cornelius Crane Chase, 1943).

The ballad has given the English language the verb to chivvy, meaning to pester or encourage someone to perform a task.
