= Edmund Sturton =

English composer of the Tudor period

Edmund Sturton (or Stourton, fl. late 15th to early 16th century) was an English composer of the Tudor period. Nothing is known about his life and career, but he is believed to be the same Sturton whose six-part setting of Ave Maria ancilla Trinitatis is found in the Lambeth Choirbook. Another six-part setting, Gaude virgo mater Christi, is in the Eton Choirbook; its voices cover a range of fifteen notes. Both compositions are attributed merely to 'Stourton' or 'Sturton', but in the Eton Choirbook a later had has added the Christian name 'Edmundus'.
