= Pepys Library =

Library at Magdalene College, Cambridge, England

Coordinates: 52.2107°N 0.1169°E

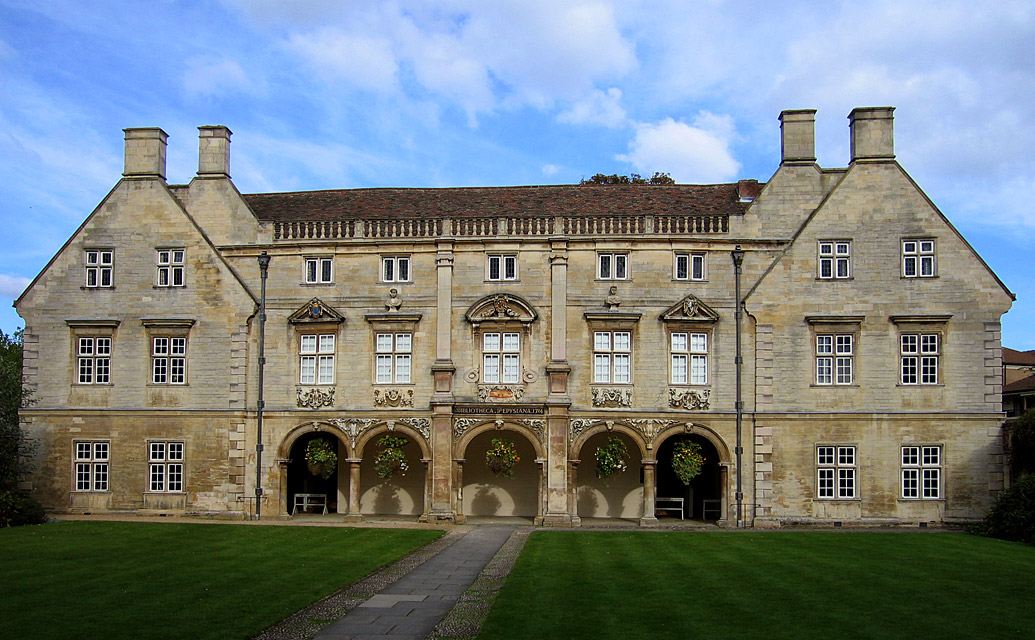
The Library is housed on the first floor of the Pepys Building of Magdalene College, Cambridge

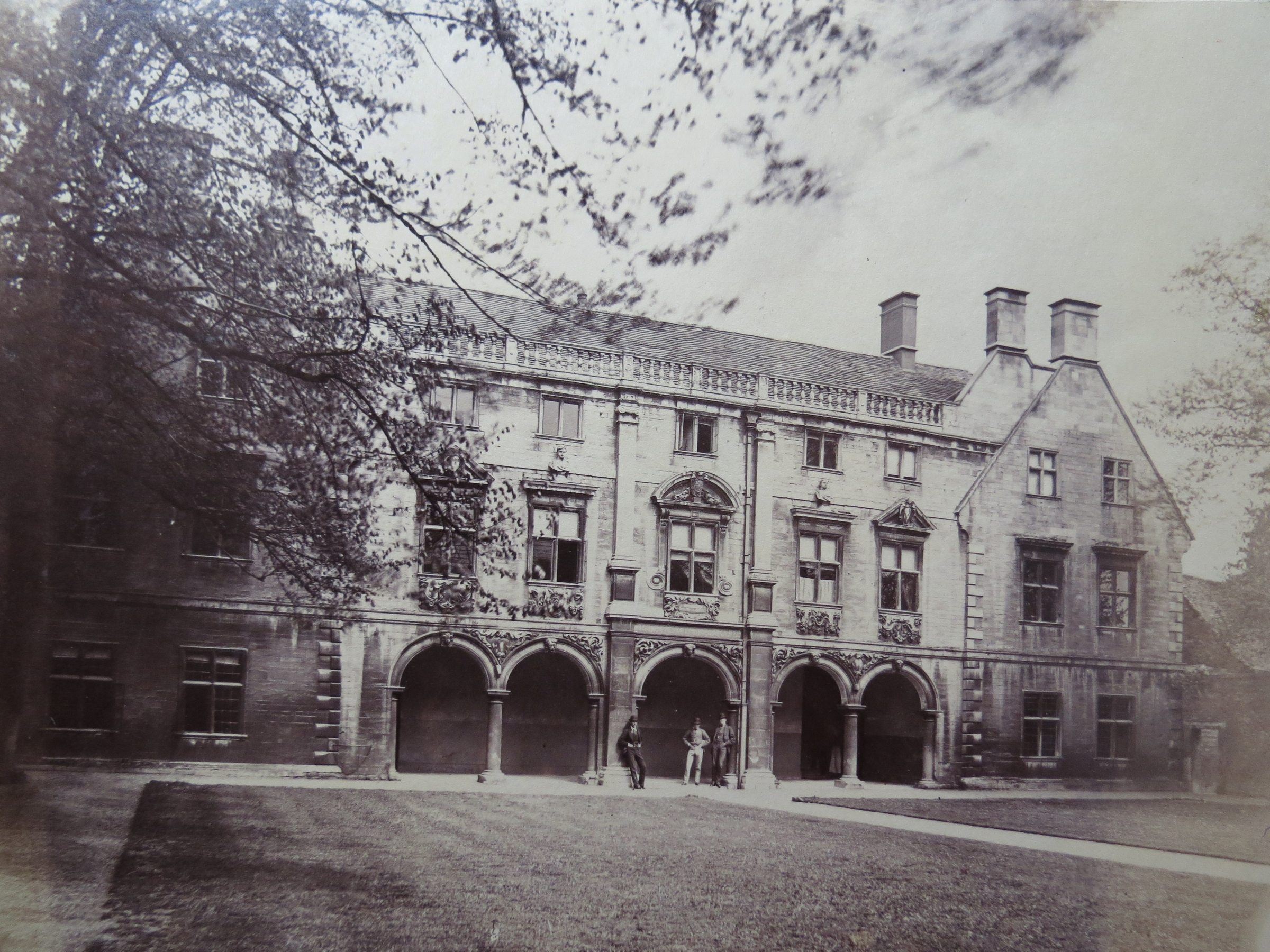
Pepys Building c 1870

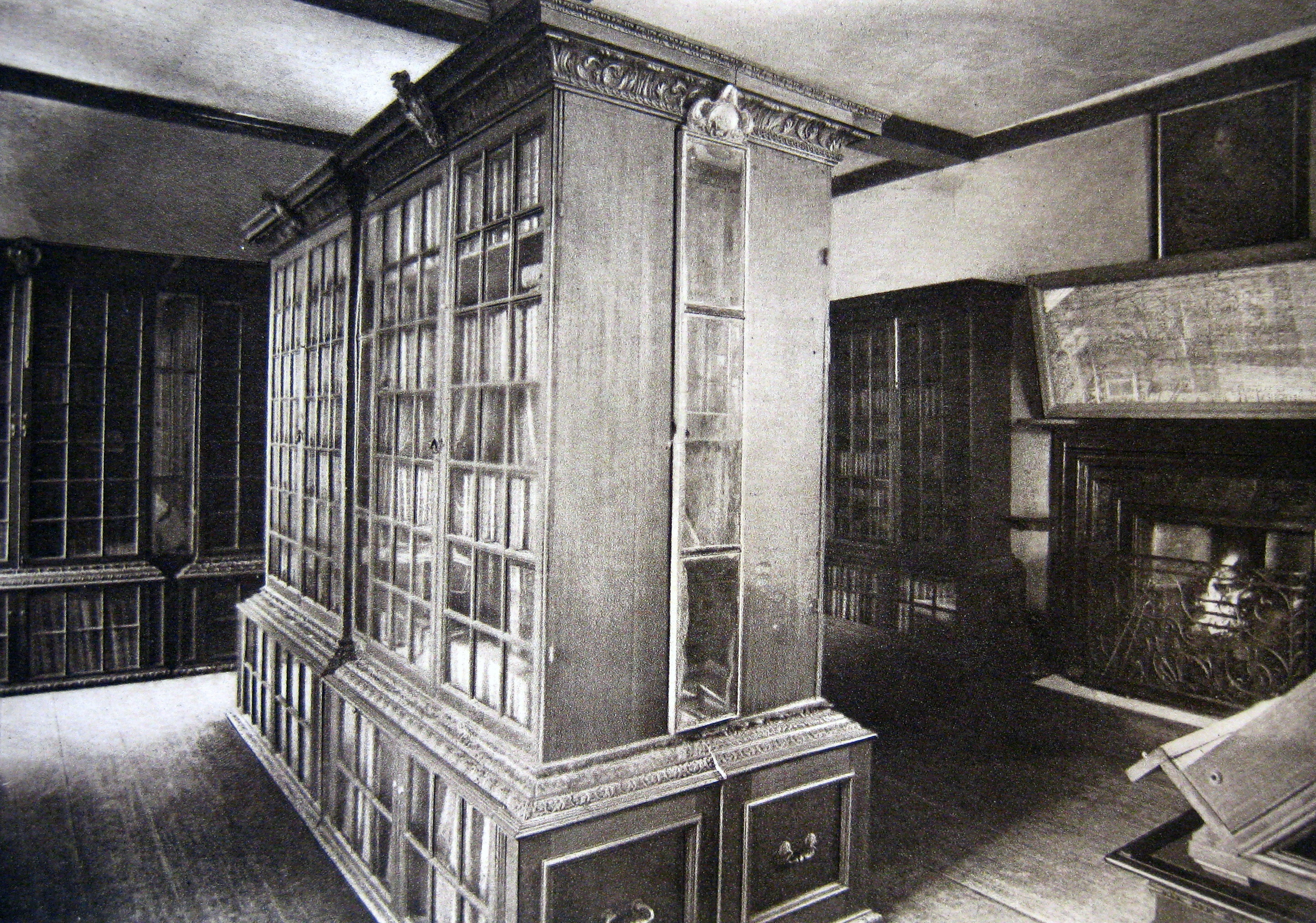
Library interior in 1890s

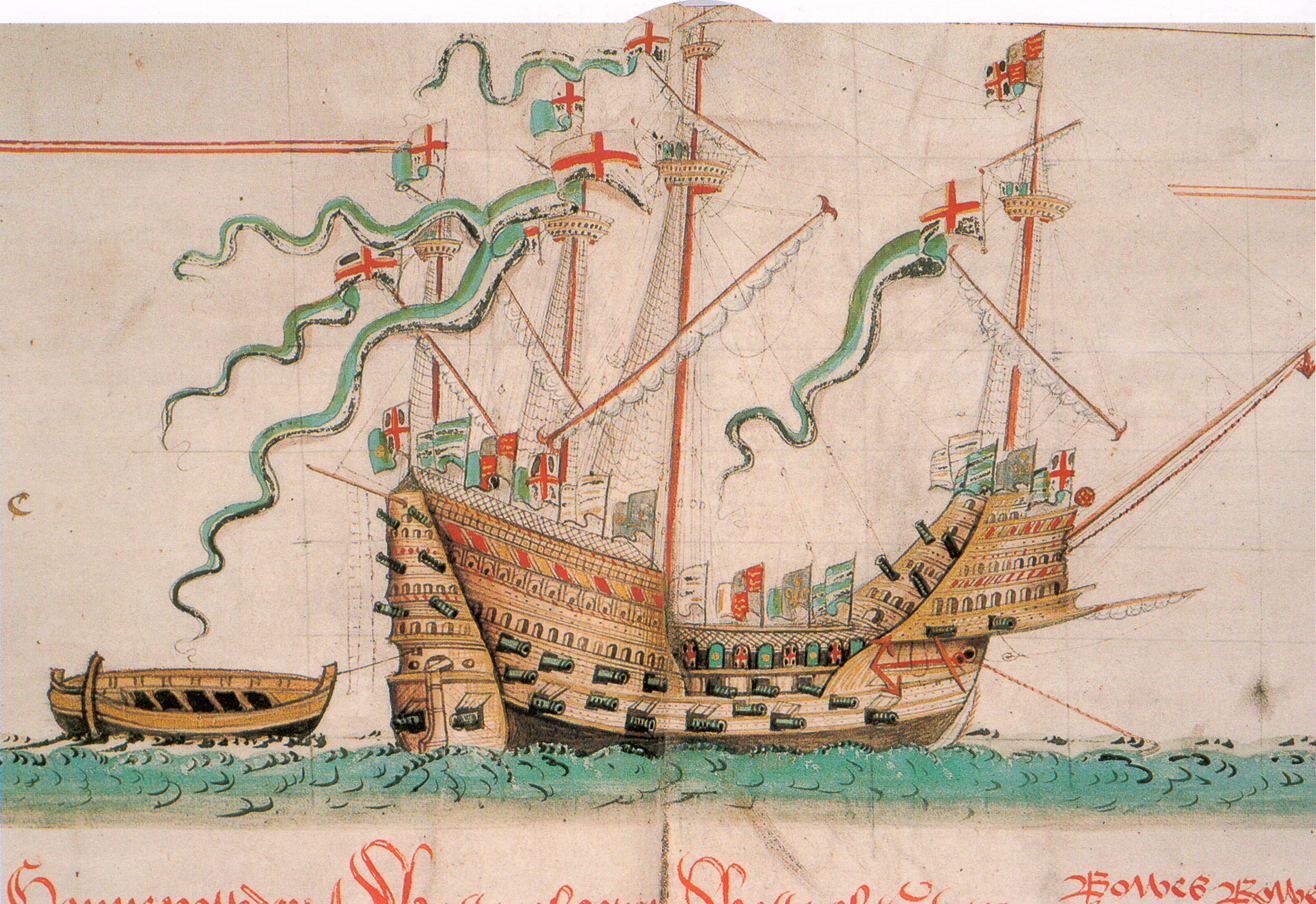
The illustration of the Mary Rose from the Anthony Roll

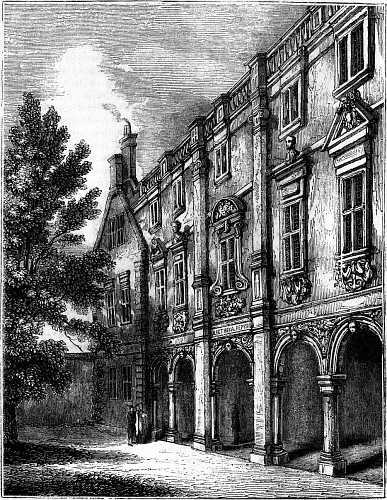
Engraving of the Pepys Building from Old England: A Pictorial Museum by Charles Knight, 1845

The Pepys Library of Magdalene College, Cambridge, is the personal library collected by Samuel Pepys which he bequeathed to the college following his death in 1703.

== Background ==
Samuel Pepys was a lifelong bibliophile and carefully nurtured his large collection of books, manuscripts, and prints. At his death, there were more than 3,000 volumes, including the diary, all carefully catalogued and indexed; they form one of the most important surviving 17th-century private libraries.

Pepys made detailed provisions in his will for the preservation of his book collection, and when his nephew and heir, John Jackson, died in 1723, it was transferred intact to Magdalene. The bequest included all the original bookcases and his elaborate instructions that placement of the books "... be strictly reviewed and, where found requiring it, more nicely adjusted". Under the terms of the bequest, none of the books may be sold, and no additional ones may be added to the library.

The library is housed in a room on the first floor of the Pepys Building in the second court of the college. It contains 3,000 books preserved in Pepys's own bookcases for them (perhaps those his journal attributes to Sympson the Joiner) and organised by size as he had catalogued them.

== The collection ==
The most important items in the Library are the six original bound manuscripts of Pepys's diary but there are other remarkable holdings, including:

- Naval records compiled by Pepys when he was Secretary to the Admiralty, including two of the "Anthony Rolls", illustrating the Royal Navy's ships circa 1546, including the Mary Rose.
- Pepys' own copy of Isaac Newton's Philosophiæ Naturalis Principia Mathematica (1687).
- Incunabula by William Caxton, Wynkyn de Worde and Richard Pynson.
- Sixty medieval manuscripts.
- The 'Pepys Manuscript', a late fifteenth-century English choirbook.
- Sir Francis Drake's personal almanac.
- The earliest copy of John Heywood's The Play of the Weather, published in 1533 shortly after being performed for Henry VIII.
- Over 1,800 printed ballads: one of the finest collections in existence and an important source for Percy's Reliques of Ancient English Poetry.

A selection of the most interesting volumes are on display.

== Visiting ==
The library is usually open to the public in the afternoons from Monday to Saturday. It is best to consult the Magdalene College website for current times.

== Pepys Building ==
The Pepys Building is the principal ornament of the College and of considerable architectural interest. The plainer rear is of brick while the front is neo-classical and in Ketton stone. Built between 1670 and 1703, it has been described as "a highly remarkable classical building of the date".

Construction was slow for want of money, but the project was revived after advice was sought from Robert Hooke in 1677. Samuel Pepys made three subscriptions to the building fund.

On the front of the building is the painted inscription Bibliotheca Pepysiana 1724 which records the date of arrival of the library; above it are painted Pepys's coat of arms and his motto "Mens cujusque is est quisque" ("The mind's the man" taken from Cicero's De re publica 6.26).
