= Queen Elanor's Confession =

Traditional song

Queen Elanor's Confession (Roud 74, Child 156) or Queen Eleanor's Confession is a traditional English-language folk ballad. Although the figures are intended as Eleanor of Aquitaine, Henry II of England, and William Marshal, the story is entirely fictional.

== Synopsis ==
The song exists in various versions, but the essential elements are as follows:

Queen Eleanor lies dying. She wishes to confess her sins to save her soul on her deathbed, but she fears that if she confesses to an English priest, he will divulge her wrongdoings to her husband, King Henry of England. Thus, she sends to France for a priest with no loyalty to the English crown (in some versions her fear of being found out is stated directly; in others, it is implied). When King Henry hears that she has sent overseas for a priest, he suspects that his wife the queen has betrayed him in some way (again, this is stated more directly in some versions than in others). To gain information about this suspected betrayal, he hatches a plan. He suggests to his friend and associate, Earl Marshall, that they both disguise themselves as French priests and go to hear the queen's confession. Earl Marshall instantly refuses (in some versions of the ballad), saying that to "beguile" the queen in this way is a punishable crime for which he'll surely be hanged. (The implication is that Earl Marshall knows very well what the content of the queen's confession will be and does not want to be there with King Henry when she delivers it.)

Desperate to learn what the queen has been doing behind his back, King Henry swears a royal oath (in most versions of the ballad) to Earl Marshall that regardless of what the queen might say, no official record will be made of it and no one will ever know that Earl Marshall helped deceive the queen. Earl Marshall relents, and the two men, dressed as French priests, go to hear the queen's deathbed confession. Queen Eleanor reveals several shocking sins.

These vary depending on the version of the ballad, but in most versions she admits: a) she lost her virginity to Earl Marshall and not to the king; b) she has tried to poison King Henry (in some versions, she says she successfully poisoned Rosamund Clifford, the king's mistress); and c) she adores her son fathered by Earl Marshall and reviles the son she has borne to King Henry. The king by now is livid and, throwing off his disguise, he reveals himself to the horrified queen. The ballad ends as King Henry says that were it not for his royal oath, he would kill Earl Marshall.
