= Roxburghe Ballads =

Book full of songs

In 1847 John Payne Collier (1789–1883) printed A Book of Roxburghe Ballads. It consisted of 1,341 broadside ballads from the seventeenth century, mostly English, originally collected by Robert Harley, 1st Earl of Oxford and Mortimer (1661–1724), later collected by John Ker, 3rd Duke of Roxburghe.

Collier also interpolated his own forgeries. He used ancient paper and wrote on the pages with a rare ink which has proved to be very enduring. Scholars have discredited these forgeries, apart from one or two which fooled singers of the 1960s. The collection is not as famous as the Child Ballads or Percy's Reliques, but important, nevertheless.

From 1869 to 1899 a new edition was produced, edited for its first three volumes by William Chappell, and then —from 1880—completed. by Joseph Woodfall Ebsworth.

There are copies in the British Library, Manchester University and America. The library of the University of Iowa has an almost complete collection of Roxburghe Club publications.
