= Choirbook =

Large format music book for use by multiple singers

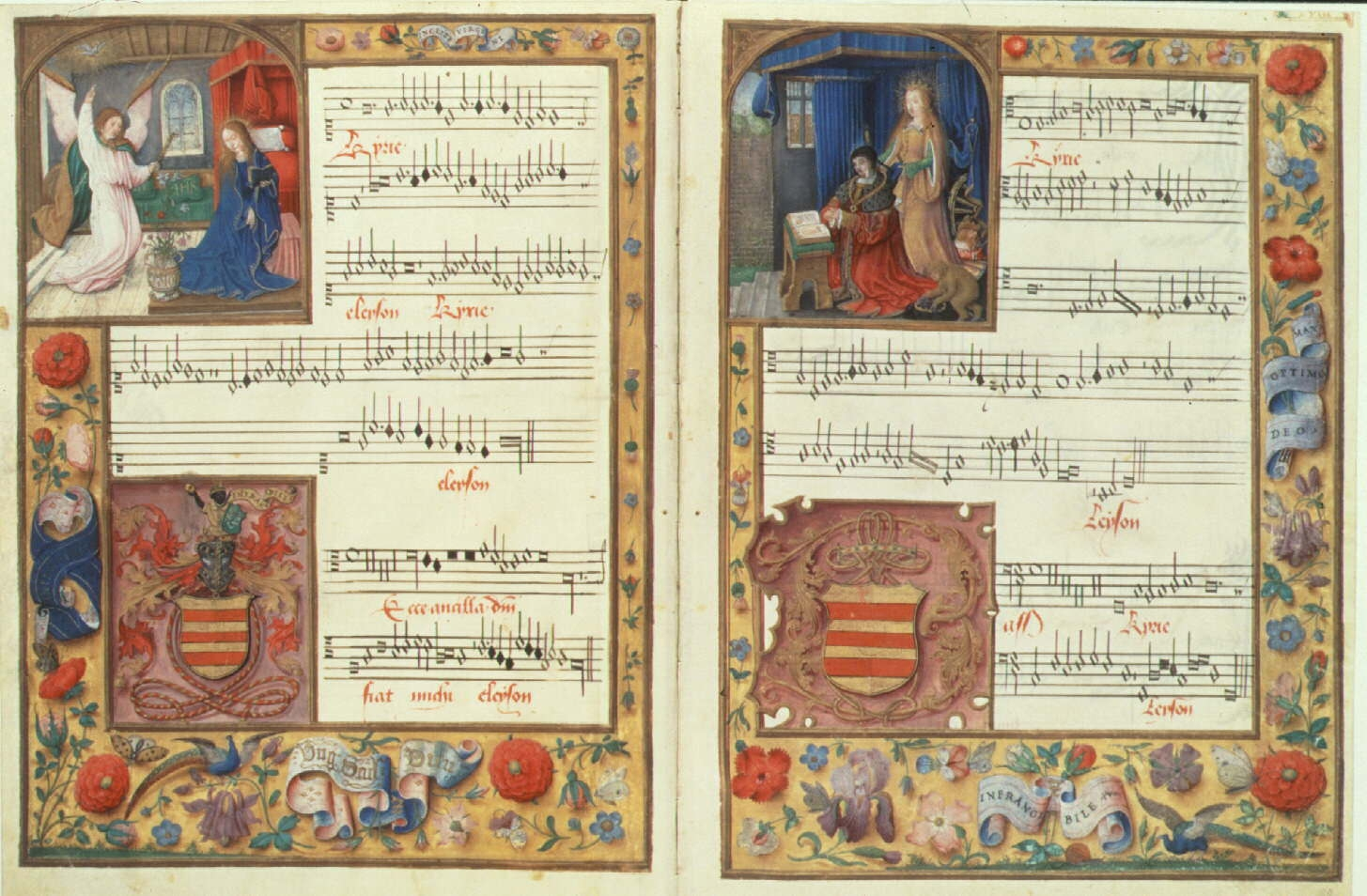
One opening (fol. 19v-20r) of the Chigi codex, showing the Kyrie of Ockeghem's Missa Ecce ancilla Domini. Cantus and tenor are on the left page, contratenor and bassus on right.

A choirbook is a large format manuscript used by choirs in churches or cathedrals during the Middle Ages and Renaissance. The book is large enough for the entire choir to read from one book and may contain either monophonic gregorian chant or polyphony, with voice parts laid out individually across an opening's facing pages.

Choirbooks were generally put on a stand with the smaller boy sopranos in front and the men in back. As the printing of music became easier and paper replaced vellum, choirbooks fell out of favour, replaced by smaller, cheaper, and easier to handle partbooks and octavos. A kind of choirbook format is still prevalent in music for piano four hands.

A choirbook was a major investment. Many of them were stark and utilitarian and show signs of heavy and constant use. At larger cathedrals, choirbooks were sometimes lavishly decorated and illuminated. Since they represent an important expense, they were rarely owned by single people, but rather by families or institutions.

== Major choirbooks ==
- Eton Choirbook
- Caius Choirbook
- Lambeth Choirbook
- Pepys Choirbook
- Leiden choirbooks
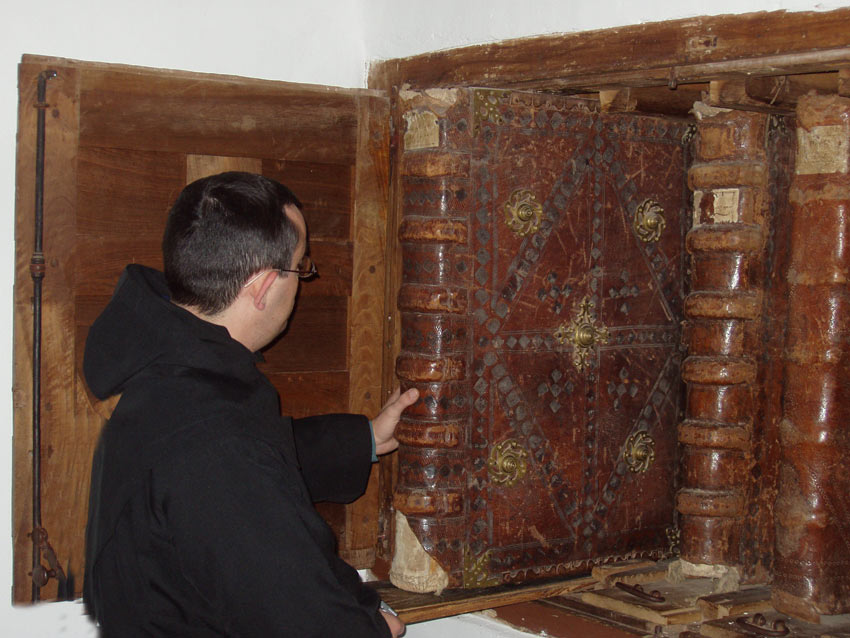
Choirbooks at San Millán de la Cogolla

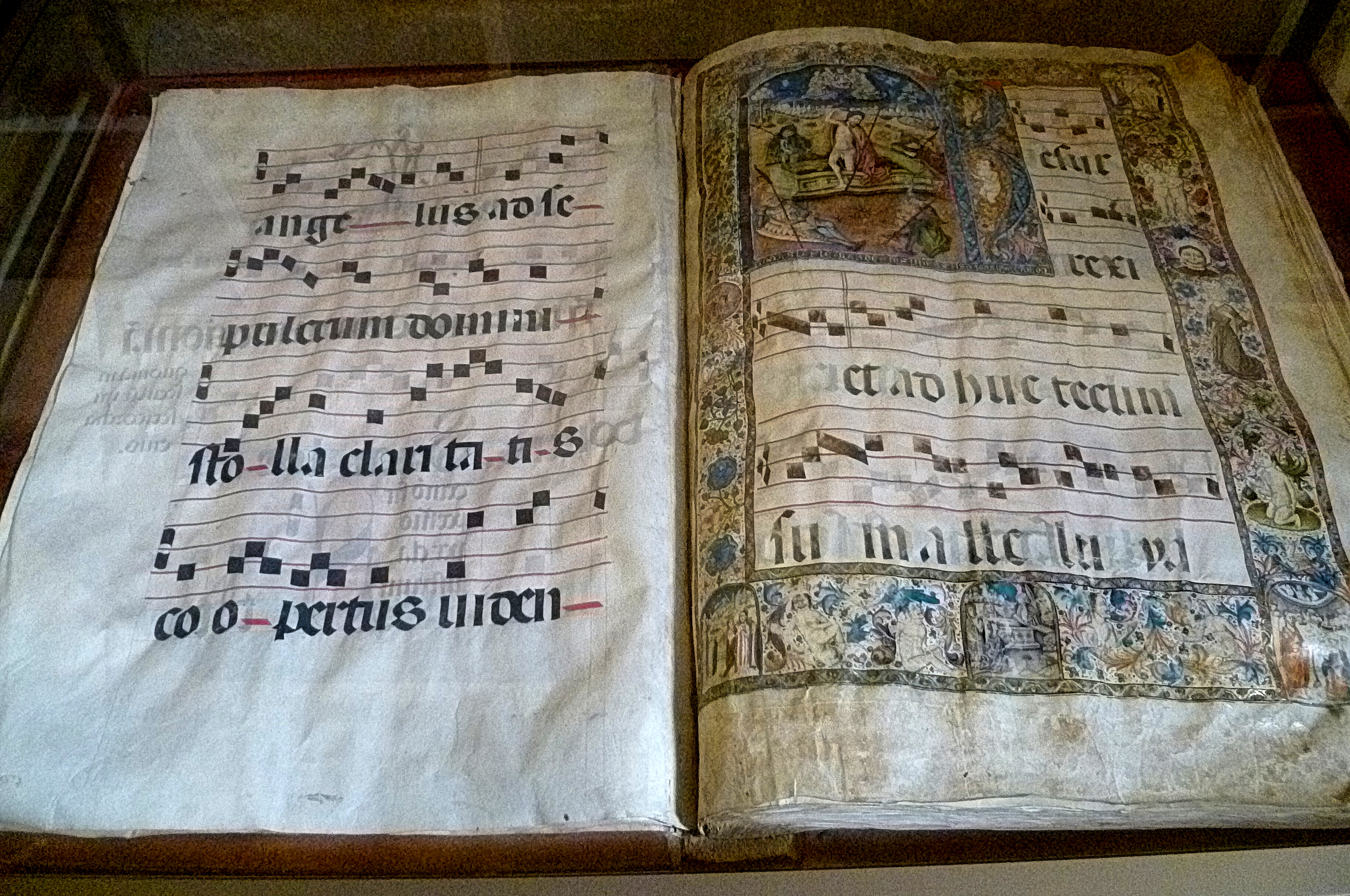
The gregorian introit for Easter, "Resurrexi" illuminated by Juan de Carrión (15th century). Museum of the Cathedral of Ávila, Spain

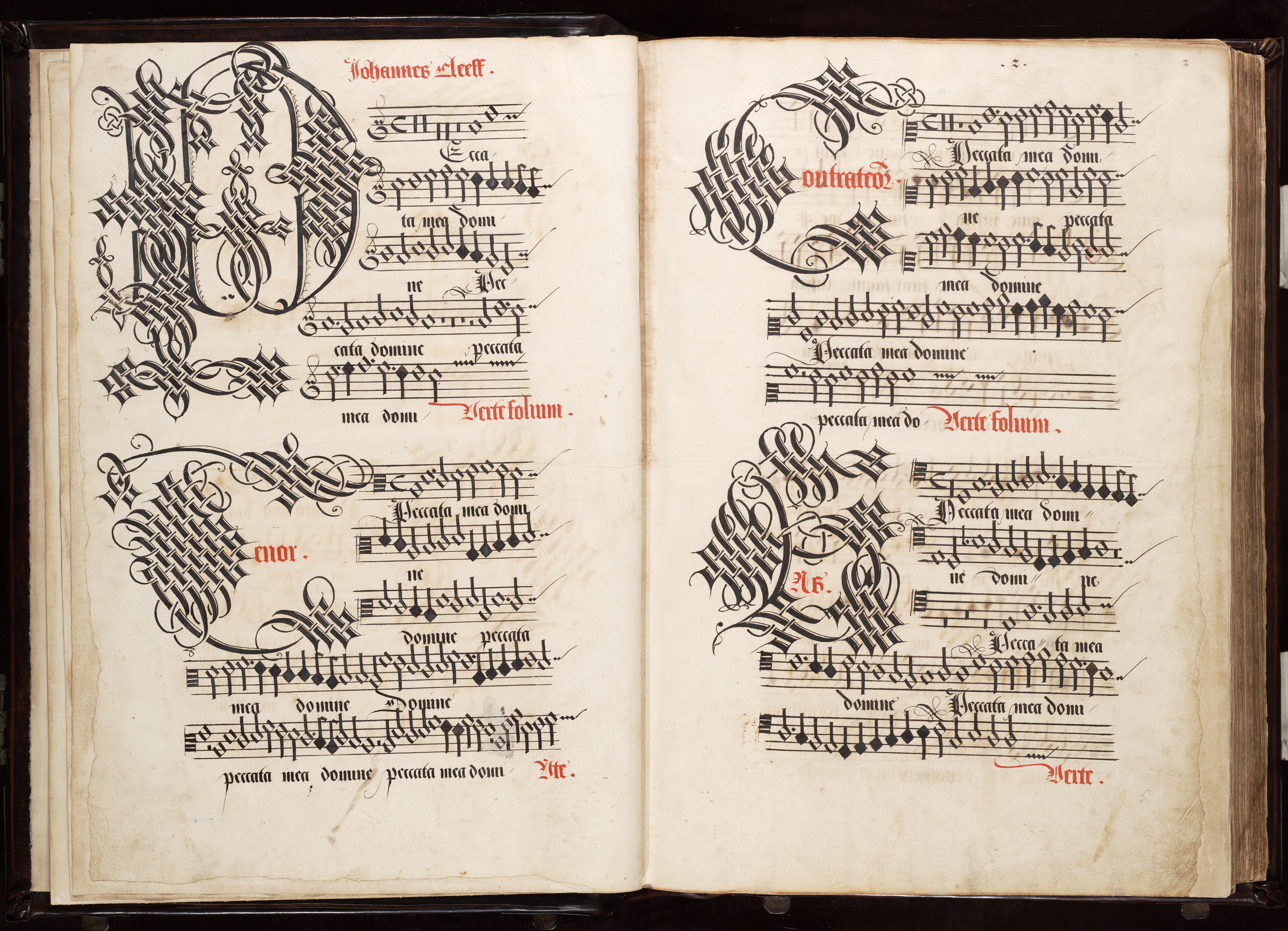
Leiden Choirbook
(16th c.)

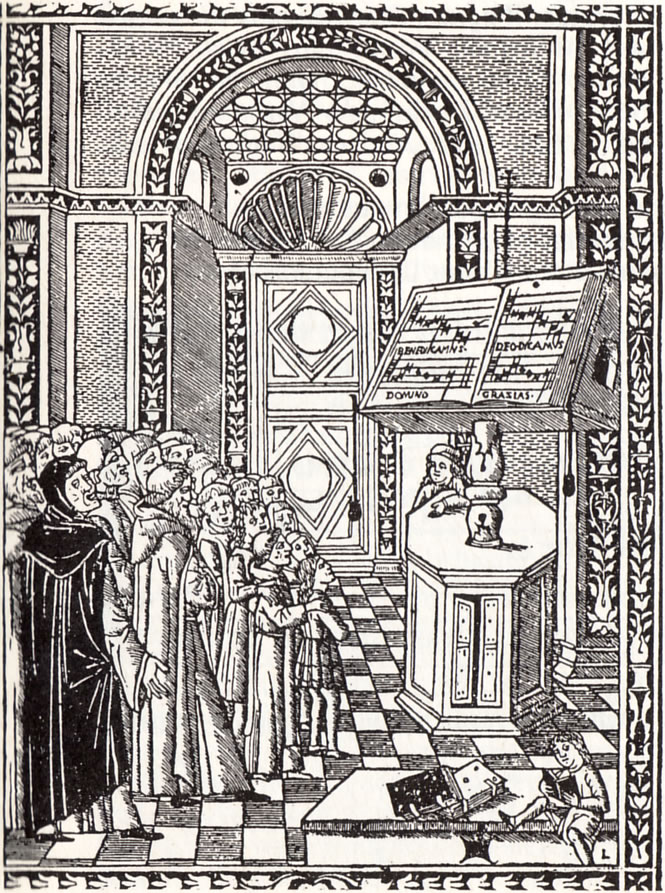
Circa 1500 woodcut
