= Trinity Carol Roll =

Medieval carol manuscript

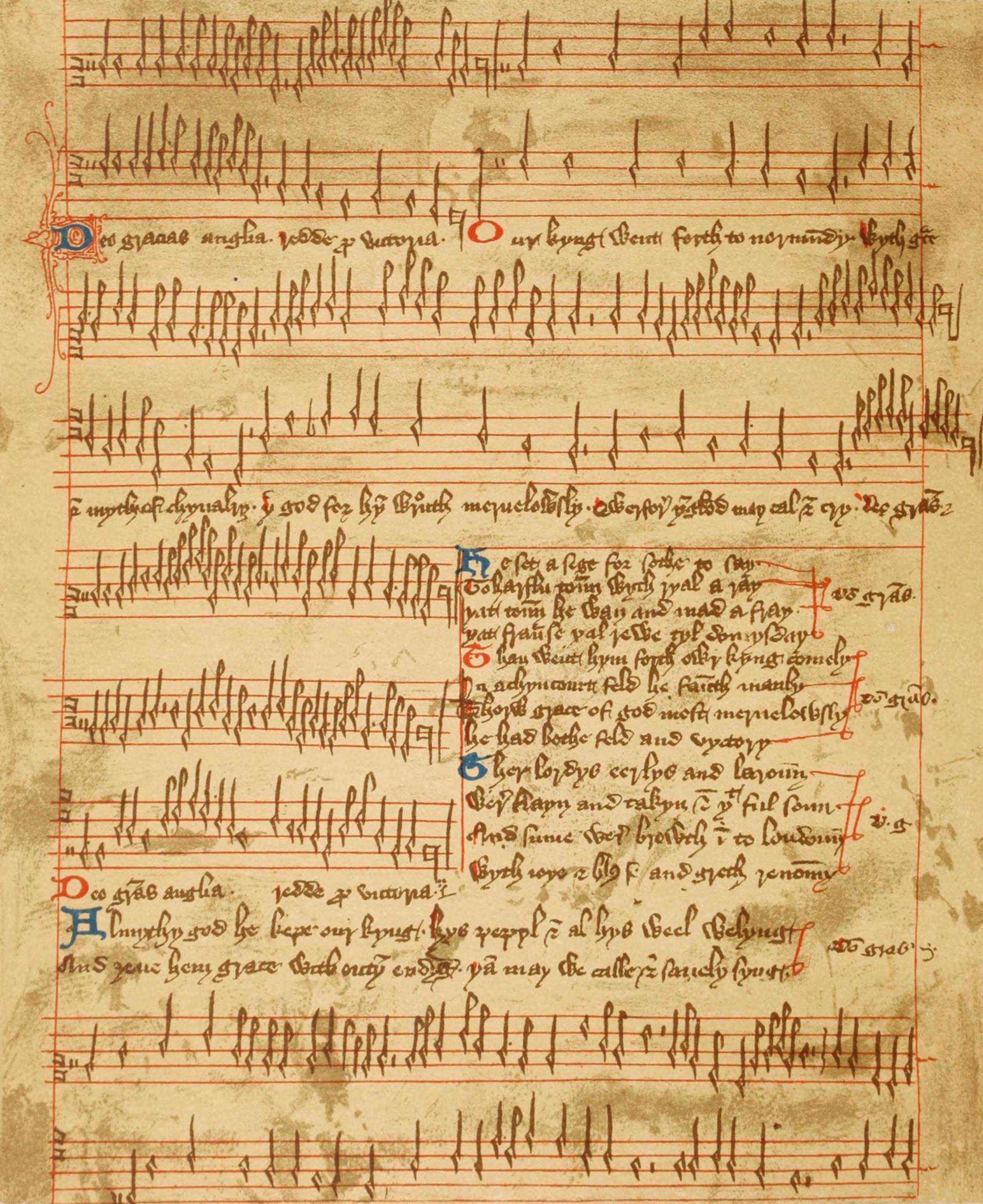
Facsimile of the Agincourt Carol in the Trinity Carol Roll (Trinity MS O.3.58)

The Trinity Carol Roll is a 15th-century manuscript of thirteen English carols held by the Wren Library at Trinity College, Cambridge (MS O.3.58). It is the earliest surviving example of polyphonic music written in English. Compiled after 1415, it contains the earliest of two manuscript sources for the Agincourt Carol which tells of Henry V's victory at the Battle of Agincourt, as well as several early Christmas carols. The majority of texts are in Middle English (in a Norfolk dialect) with some of the carols alternating between Latin and Middle English, a common form for carols of the period known as macaronic.

== Description ==
Parchment scrolls were a common method of documentation in the Middle Ages, being both cheaper and easier to transport and store than bound books. However, their lack of protective covers meant they were comparatively prone to damage and loss. The Trinity Roll's provenance is unknown; the manuscript was given to Trinity College by Henricus Octavus Roe of Baldock in 1838, but is not recorded before this time.

The scroll is made from vellum 2 metres (6 ft 7 in) long and 17 centimetres (6.7 in) wide. When rolled, it forms a cylinder approximately 6 centimetres (2.4 in) in diameter.

The carols are noted in mensural notation on five-line staves. The beginning of each song is marked by decorative initials in blue ink with red adornments and each stanza is marked by a smaller blue or red initial. The text is handwritten in the Cursiva Anglicana script of the period, a form of writing initially used for letters and legal documents which soon became the most commonly used script for copying English literary texts of the period, for example the manuscripts of Geoffrey Chaucer and William Langland. A faded inscription is at the head of the roll, and the outer side of the roll (dorse) has prayers for four masses inscribed by another, later hand.

Analysis of the dialect in the carols on the roll imply that the scribe was from South Norfolk: the inclusion of Deo Gratias Anglia referencing Henry V's victory at Agincourt in 1415 gives an indication of the time frame of the composition of the carols. Some sources, for example J.A. Fuller Maitland suggest that carols were all composed by the same hand, but whether this was the scribe is unknown.

== Contents ==
The thirteen carols included in the roll are as follows:

1. Hail mary ful of grace (Hail Mary full of grace)
2. Nowel nowel (Noel, Noel)
3. Alma redemptoris mater (Loving Mother of our Saviour)
4. Now may we syngyn (Now may we sing)
5. Be mery be mery (Be merry be merry)
6. Nowel syng we now (Nowell sing we now)
7. Deo gratias Anglia (England give thanks to God) (a. k. Agincourt Carol)
8. Now make we merthe (Now make we mirth)
9. Abyde I hope (Abide I hope)
10. Qwat tydyngis bryngyst yu massager (What tidings bring you messenger?)
11. Eya martir stephane (Eia [exclamation] martyr Stephen)
12. Prey for us ye prynce of pees (Pray for us ye prince of peace)
13. Ther is no rose of swych vertu (There is no rose of such virtue)

=== Texts ===
Christmas forms the subject of the majority of the carol's texts; six are on the subject of the Nativity of Jesus, two are about Saint Stephen and Saint John the Evangelist respectively, whose feast-days are on 26 and 27 December and three are Marian texts praising the Virgin Mary.

The two remaining carols are a Christian moral text and the Agincourt Carol. It is speculated that the latter may have formed part of a pageant staged in London in November 1415.

The texts are all composed in Middle English, but several are macaronic, incorporating Latin phrases from the liturgy of the Catholic Church, often as their burdens (choruses found at the beginning of the texts and repeated after each verse). For example, in the Agincourt Carol every stanza ends with the phrase Deo gratias ('Thanks be to God') – as all church services were conducted in Latin, even non-speakers would have been familiar with their meaning.

=== Music ===
Although a large body of medieval carol texts survive, the Trinity Roll is almost unique in also containing the music for the carols. The music was formerly thought to have been composed by John Dunstable. In his 1891 study of the carols, J Fuller Maitland opines:

Few of the songs have absolute melodic beauty such as would make them popular nowadays...[but] they have a special value, since they are almost the only existing specimens of English music of the period, or at all events the only specimens which have not been tampered with before reaching us in their modern dress. They are especially valuable, moreover, as being almost without a doubt the work of one composer...The similarity of certain passages is so remarkable (compare the opening bars of VIII and XIII) that there can be little doubt that the roll is a genuine transcript of original works by one composer, not a mere collection of stray pieces.

Modern scholars of early music are more complimentary, particularly of their writing for multiple independent voices. Dr Helen Deeming notes that the carols are:

complex and intricate, and could only have been composed, sung and notated by highly trained musicians. Their part-writing, for two or three independent voices, is of a musical sophistication that goes well beyond the plainsong that formed the musical bread-and-butter of most medieval choirs.

== Performance and recordings ==
Of the carols, "There is No Rose of Such Virtue" has re-entered the repertoire, appearing in its original polyphonic form in services such as A Festival of Nine Lessons and Carols from King's College Cambridge. Alternative settings by John Joubert and Benjamin Britten using the text of the carol have also been composed. The Agincourt Carol, which also survives in a contemporaneous version in the Bodleian Library is also well-known, for example appearing in an arrangement by William Walton for Laurence Olivier's 1944 film Henry V. The composer Ernest Farrar used the Agincourt Carol as the basis for his 1918 Heroic Elegy: For Soldiers.

The Alamire consort recorded the complete carol roll in the Wren Library at Trinity College in September 2011, available on CD on the Obsidian label (CD709).

== See also ==
- List of Christmas carols
