= Lambeth Choirbook =

The Lambeth Choirbook – also known as the Arundel Choirbook – is an illuminated choirbook dating to the sixteenth century. It contains music for 7 Masses, 4 Magnificats, and 8 motets. Much of the music is by Tudor-period composers. The major contributors are Robert Fayrfax and Nicholas Ludford; between them they contributed at least ten of its nineteen pieces. Only three of Fayrfax's works have his name attached to them, but five other pieces are known as his; these, along with two by Ludford, are known from concordances in the Caius Choirbook and other manuscripts. Seven anonymous pieces exist in the book:

- Ave Dei Patris filia
- Ave mundi spes Maria
- Gaude flore virginali
- Salve regina
- two Magnificats
- Vidi aquam egredientem de templo (antiphon at the Aspersion before Mass during Eastertide).

No concordances for any of these have been traced, and it seems possible that further works by Fayrfax and Ludford might exist among them. The book also contains music by older composers, such as Edmund Stourton and Walter Lambe, whose music may also be found in the Eton Choirbook.

The book is now housed in Lambeth Palace Library under the reference MS 1.

== Sources ==
- HOASM.org
- Digital Image Archive of Medieval Music

== Bibliography ==
- Skinner, David: The Arundel Choirbook (London, Lambeth Palace Library, MS 1): a Facsimile and Introduction (London: Roxburghe Club, 2003)
- Curtis, Gareth; Wathey, Andrew: "Fifteenth-Century English Liturgical Music: A List of the Surviving Repertory" Royal Musical Association Research Chronicle, 27 (1994), 1–69
- Benham, Hugh: Latin Church Music in England c.1460–1575 (London, 1977), 22–24, passim
- Chew, Geoffrey: "The Provenance and Date of the Caius and Lambeth Choir-Books", Music and Letters, 51 (1970), 107–17
- Bray, Roger W: The Interpretation of Musica Ficta in English Music, c.1490–c.1580, Unpublished Ph.D. dissertation, Oxford University (1969), I, 115ff; II, 43-68
- Warren, Edwin B.: Life and Works of Robert Fayrfax, Musicological Studies and Documents vol. 22 (American Institute of Musicology, 1969), 42, 59–60, passim
- Kirsch, Winfried: Die Quellen der mehrstimmigen Magnificat- und Te Deum-Vertonungen bis zur Mitte des 16. Jahrhunderts (Tutzing, 1966), 145
- Todd, Henry J: A Catalogue of the Archiépiscopal Manuscripts in the Library at Lambeth Palace. London, 1812 (London, 1965), 1
- Bergsagel, John D. (ed.): Nicholas Ludford (c.1485–c.1557): Collected Works, Corpus mensurabilis musicae vol. 27 (Neuhausen nr. Stuttgart: American Institute of Musicology, 1963–), Il, xiv–xv, 1–38, 130–79
- Harrison, Frank Ll. (ed.): Early English Church Music (London: Stainer & Bell, 1963–), 4, 1–48, 130–31
- Harrison, Frank Ll.: Music in Medieval Britain (London, 1963), 263–69, 307, 329–30, 335
- Warren, Edwin B. (ed.): Robert Fayrfax (ca. 1464-1521): Collected Works, Corpus mensurabilis musicae Vol. 17 (Neuhausen nr. Stuttgart: American Institute of Musicology, 1959–66), I–II
- Lyon, Margaret Elizabeth: Early Tudor Church Music: The Lambeth and Caius Manuscripts, Unpublished Ph.D. dissertation, University of California at Berkeley (1957), I–II
- Westrup, J. A., et al. (eds.): New Oxford History of Music (London, New York, and Toronto, 1954–), 3, 308, 321ff
- Blume, Friedrich (ed.): Die Musik in Geschichte und Gegenwart: Allgemeine Enzyklopädie der Musik (Kassel, 1949–79) [cited by volume and column number], 2, 1347; 6, 378; 8, 1173
- James, Montague Rhodes; Jenkins, Claude: A Descriptive Catalogue of the Manuscripts in the Library of Lambeth Palace (Cambridge, 1930–32), 1
- Collins, H. B.: "Latin Church Music by Early English Composers", Proceedings of the Royal Musical Association 39 (1912–13), 55–83; 43 (1916–17), 97–121 (XLIII), at 98–101, 104–6
- Frere, Walter Howard: Bibliotheca Musico-Liturgica: A Descriptive Handlist of the Musical and Latin-Liturgical Mss. of the Middle Ages Preserved in the Libraries of Great Britain and Ireland (London, 1894–1932; reprint Hildesheim, 1967), 1, 4
