= List of pro-Palestinian protests in the United Kingdom =

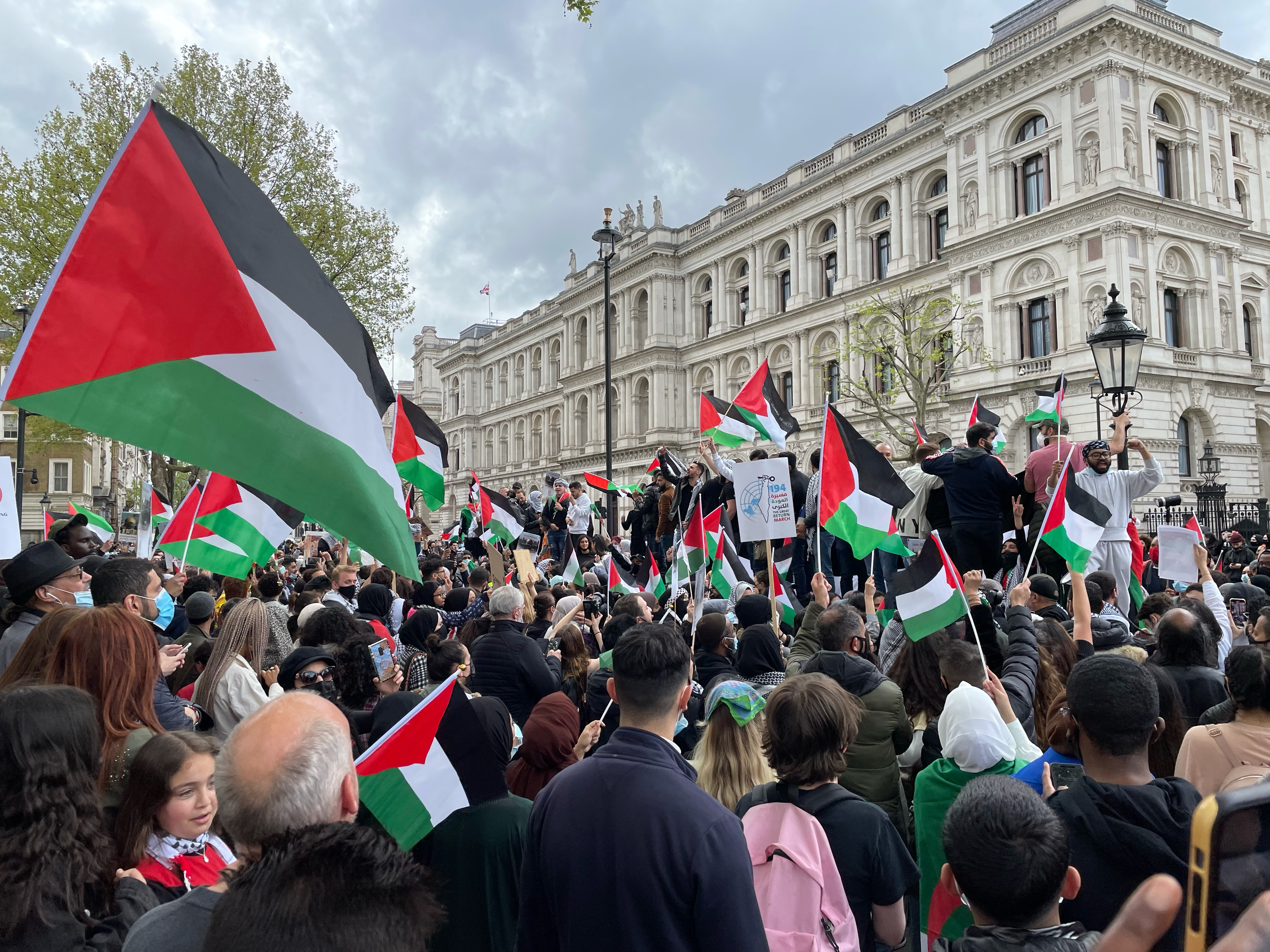
Demonstration near the Prime Minister's office in London, 9 May 2021

This is a list of pro-Palestinian protests in the United Kingdom including demonstrations, marches, sit-ins, direct actions, and campus encampments in support of Palestinian rights.

== List ==
Estimated attendance is either mentioned explicitly in the references or a midpoint is used, i.e., 50 when dozens are mentioned, 500 when hundreds are mentioned, and so on.

=== Pre-2023 ===
| Date | City/town | Estimated attendance | Description | Ref(s) |
|---|---|---|---|---|
| 31 August 1975 | London | ? | Demonstration and march through the city centre. | |
| 13 May 1978 | London | ? | Demonstration and march through the city centre. | |
| 17 September 1983 | London | ? | Demonstration and march through the city centre on the occasion of the first anniversary of the Sabra and Shatila massacre. | |
| 18 May 2002 | London | ? | Demonstration and rally in the Trafalgar Square. | |
| 17 May 2003 | London | 6,000 | Demonstration in the Trafalgar Square on the occasion of the 55th anniversary of the Nakba. | |
| 27 September 2003 | London | 100,000 | Demonstration and march through the city centre in solidarity with Palestinian and Iraqi victims. | |
| 22 July 2006 | London | 10,000 | Demonstration and march through the city centre. Protesters also showed support for the victims of the Israeli attacks amid the 2006 Lebanon War. | |
| 30 December 2008 | London | 600 | Demonstration outside the Israeli embassy. | |
| 3 January 2009 | Kingston upon Hull | 100+ | Demonstration and march through the city centre. | |
| 3 January 2009 | London | 6,000-50,000 | Demonstration and march through the city centre. Protesters threw thousands of shoes symbolising anger against the latest wave of bombing by Israel on Gaza. | |
| 10 January 2009 | London | 100,000 | Demonstration and march through the city centre. | |
| 17 January 2009 | Birmingham | 3,000-5,000 | Demonstration and march through the city centre. | |
| 17 January 2009 | London | 3,500 | Demonstration in the Trafalgar Square. | |
| 5 June 2010 | London | 5,000 | Demonstration outside Prime Minister David Cameron's official residence. | |
| 2 September 2011 | London | ? | Disruption of a concert by the Israel Philharmonic Orchestra at the Royal Albert Hall. | |
| 12 April 2012 | London | 300 | Demonstration outside the Israeli embassy. A group of 500 pro-Israel demonstrators was also present. Clashes occurred between the groups. Ended with police intervention. Several protesters were injured. Six pro-Palestine protesters were arrested. | |
| 26 July 2014 | London | 45,000-100,000 | Demonstration and march through the city centre. | |
| 9 August 2014 | London | 20,000-150,000 | Demonstration and march through the city centre. | |
| 17 October 2015 | London | 150 | Blocking of traffic at Oxford Circus. | |
| 4 November 2017 | London | 3,000 | Demonstration and march through the city centre in protest of the centenary of the Balfour Declaration. | |
| 8 December 2017 | London | ? | Demonstration outside the US embassy against US President Donald Trump's decision to recognise Jerusalem as the capital of Israel. Bella Hadid joined the protests. | |
| 30 March 2019 | London | 500 | Demonstration outside the Israeli embassy. | |
| 30 March 2019 | London | 5,000 | Demonstration and march through the city centre. | |
| 11 May 2019 | London | 5,000 | Demonstration and march through the city centre. | |
| 6 September 2020 | London | 50 | Demonstration outside the headquarters of Elbit Systems to highlight its role in supplying 85% of the drones used by the Israeli army and demanding its immediate closure. | |
| 1 February 2021 | Oldham | ? | Blocking of the entrance of the Elbit Ferranti factory. Activists from Palestine Action and Extinction Rebellion protesters chained the gates, unfurled banners, and sprayed red paint. | |
| 13 April 2021 | Bristol | 2 | Occupation on top of the roof of the Bristol headquarters of Elbit Systems. The activists from Palestine Action climbed to the roof, unfurled Palestinian flags, and sprayed red paint over the building. The occupation lasted for several hours. | |
| 9 May 2021 | Bradford | ? | Demonstration in the city centre organised by Muslim Association of Britain amid the 2021 Israel–Palestine crisis. | |
| 9 May 2021 | Birmingham | ? | Demonstration in the city centre organised by Muslim Association of Britain amid the 2021 Israel–Palestine crisis. | |
| 9 May 2021 | London | ? | Demonstration in the city centre organised by Muslim Association of Britain amid the 2021 Israel–Palestine crisis. | |
| 9 May 2021 | Manchester | ? | Demonstration in the city centre organised by Muslim Association of Britain amid the 2021 Israel–Palestine crisis. | |
| 14 May 2021 | Liverpool | ? | Disruption of traffic at the Queensway tunnel. | |
| 15 May 2021 | Leamington Spa | 70 | Demonstration and vigil organised by the "Justice for Palestinians – Leamington Spa" in town centre. | |
| 15 May 2021 | Southampton | 100+ | Demonstration and march though the city centre. | |
| 15 May 2021 | London | 150,000 | Demonstration and march through the city centre in response to the escalation of attacks by the Israeli army amid the 2021 Israel–Palestine crisis. Thirteen protesters were arrested. | |
| 19 May 2021 | Leicester | 4 | Occupation of an Elbit Systems-owned unmanned aerial vehicle (drone) factory in Meridian Business Park. Palestine Action activists climbed to the roof of the factory. Lasted until 25 May. Ten protesters were arrested. | |
| 21 May 2021 | Leicester | 500 | Demonstration outside Meridian Business Park Elbit factory in support of the ongoing occupation. | |
| 22 May 2021 | Nottingham | ? | Demonstration and march through the city centre. | |
| 22 May 2021 | Peterborough | ? | Demonstration and march through the city centre. | |
| 22 May 2021 | Bristol | ? | Demonstration and march through the city centre. | |
| 22 May 2021 | London | 180,000 | Demonstration and march through the city centre. | |
| 22 May 2021 | Cardiff | 400 | Demonstration in the city centre. | |
| 23 May 2021 | Scunthorpe | ? | Demonstration at Britannia Corner in Scunthorpe. | |
| 29 May 2021 | Salford | 500 | Climbing on to a BBC building in MediaCityUK. The protesters chanted "BBC shame on you" and criticised BBC for its "biased" coverage of the situation. | |
| 29 May 2021 | Birmingham | 1,000 | Demonstration and march through the city centre. Three protesters burned Israeli flags. | |
| 29 May 2021 | Chelmsford | 400 | Demonstration outside of Shire Hall, Chelmsford. | |
| 12 June 2021 | London | 5,000 | Demonstration and march through the city centre to demand the stopping of arms sales with Israel. Protesters gathered at Downing Street to call for G7 leaders to end their support for Israel ahead of the G7 summit. | |
| 26 June 2021 | London | 5,000 | Demonstration and march through the city centre. | |
| 22 November 2021 | Wrexham | 4 | Four people were arrested for staging a protest on top of a Solvay factory in Wrexham. | |

=== 2023 ===
| Date | City/town | Estimated attendance | Description | Ref(s) |
|---|---|---|---|---|
| 24 March 2023 | London | 500 | Demonstration and march through the city centre in protest of a visit by Benjamin Netanyahu. | |
| 5 July 2023 | London | 5,000 | Demonstration and march through the city centre. | |
| 9 October 2023 | London | 5,000 | Demonstration outside the Israeli embassy. Three protesters were arrested. | |
| 11 October 2023 | Bradford | 100+ | Demonstration and march through the city centre. | |
| 14 October 2023 | Aberdeen | ? | Demonstration in the city centre. | |
| 14 October 2023 | Bristol | ? | Demonstration and march through the city centre. | |
| 14 October 2023 | Cambridge | ? | Demonstration and march through the city centre. | |
| 14 October 2023 | Coventry | ? | Demonstration and march through the city centre. | |
| 14 October 2023 | Dundee | ? | Demonstration in the city centre. | |
| 14 October 2023 | Forres | ? | Demonstration in the city centre. | |
| 14 October 2023 | Liverpool | ? | Demonstration and march through the city centre. | |
| 14 October 2023 | London | ? | Defacing of the facade of the BBC headquarters in Portland Place with red paint. | |
| 14 October 2023 | Norwich | ? | Demonstration and march through the city centre. | |
| 14 October 2023 | Swansea | ? | Demonstration and march through the city centre. | |
| 14 October 2023 | Edinburgh | 500 | Demonstration and march through the city centre. | |
| 14 October 2023 | Manchester | 1,500 | Demonstration and march through the city centre. | |
| 14 October 2023 | Glasgow | 5,000 | Demonstration and march through the city centre. | |
| 14 October 2023 | London | 5,000 | Demonstration and march through the city centre. | |
| 15 October 2023 | Colchester | ? | Demonstration outside of Castle Park, Colchester. | |
| 20 October 2023 | Blackburn | ? | Peace vigil held in the square outside the town hall. | |
| 21 October 2023 | Belfast | ? | Demonstration outside the BBC Northern Ireland headquarters. | |
| 21 October 2023 | Birmingham | ? | Demonstration and march through the city centre. | |
| 21 October 2023 | Salford | ? | Demonstration and march through the city centre. | |
| 21 October 2023 | Cardiff | 1,000 | Demonstration and march through the city centre. | |
| 21 October 2023 | London | 100,000 | Demonstration and march through the city centre. Ten protesters were arrested. | |
| 21 October 2023 | Inverness | ? | Demonstration outside of Inverness Town House. | |
| 22 October 2023 | Doncaster | 100+ | Demonstration in the city centre. | |
| 22 October 2023 | Lerwick | 20 | Demonstration at Lerwick Town Hall. | |
| 22 October 2023 | Warrington | 100+ | Demonstration and march through the city centre. | |
| 28 October 2023 | Sheffield | 500 | Demonstration and march through the city centre. | |
| 28 October 2023 | Dundee | 600 | Demonstration and march through the city centre. One protester was arrested the following morning at home in connection to this march. | |
| 28 October 2023 | Leeds | 5,000 | Demonstration and march through the city centre. | |
| 28 October 2023 | London | 70,000 | Demonstration and march through the city centre. Nine protesters were arrested. | |
| 2 November 2023 | Swindon | 100+ | Demonstration and march through the city centre. | |
| 4 November 2023 | Edinburgh | ? | Sit-in at the train station. | |
| 4 November 2023 | Glasgow | ? | Sit-in at the train station. | |
| 4 November 2023 | Manchester | 5,000 | Demonstration outside Manchester Central Library. | |
| 4 November 2023 | London | 30,000 | Demonstration and march through the city centre. Blocking of traffic with a sit-in in Oxford Street. 29 protesters were arrested. | |
| 4 November 2023 | Carlisle | ? | Demonstration in front of the House of Fraser in Carlisle. | |
| 5 November 2023 | Middlesbrough | 2,000 | Demonstration and march in the city centre. | |
| 7 November 2023 | St Helier | 150 | Demonstration in Royal Square in St Helier, Jersey, demanding the government to call for a cessefire in the Gaza Strip. | |
| 9 November 2023 | Winchester | 15 | Demonstration in downtown Winchester. | |
| 11 November 2023 | Aberdeen | ? | Demonstration and march through the city centre. | |
| 11 November 2023 | Edinburgh | ? | Demonstration in the city centre. Blocking of tram traffic. | |
| 11 November 2023 | Dumfries | ? | Demonstration and march through the city centre. | |
| 11 November 2023 | Forres | ? | Demonstration and march through the city centre. | |
| 11 November 2023 | Glasgow | 5,000 | Demonstration and march through the city centre. | |
| 11 November 2023 | London | 300,000 | Demonstration and march through the city centre. | |
| 11 November 2023 | Lerwick | 50 | Demonstration outside of Lerwick City Hall. | |
| 12 November 2023 | Southampton | 100+ | Demonstration in the city centre. | |
| 18 November 2023 | Bath | 100+ | Demonstration and march in the city centre. | |
| 18 November 2023 | Bournemouth | 100+ | Demonstration and march through the city centre. | |
| 18 November 2023 | Stevenage | 300 | Demonstration through the city centre. | |
| 25 November 2023 | London | 45,000 | Demonstration and march through the city centre. | |
| 2 December 2023 | Guernsey | 100–150 | Demonstration and march through the city centre. | |
| 9 December 2023 | London | 50,000 | Demonstration and march through the city centre. | |

=== 2024 ===
| Date | City/town | Estimated attendance | Description | Ref(s) |
|---|---|---|---|---|
| 6 January 2024 | Sleaford | 30 | Demonstration and march through the town centre. | |
| 13 January 2024 | London | 5,000 | Demonstration and march through the city centre. Nine protesters were arrested. | |
| 18 January 2024 | Skipton | ? | Demonstration outside of a Barclays Bank in the town. | |
| 3 February 2024 | London | 10,000 | Demonstration and march through the city centre. | |
| 3 February 2024 | Kendal | ? | Demonstration outside town hall. | |
| 10 February 2024 | Ipswich | ? | Demonstration by the Palestine Solidarity Campaign outside of the Axa building in Ipswich to protest the company's ties of financing Israeli settlements in the West Bank. | |
| 17 February 2024 | London | 200,000-250,000 | Demonstration and march through the city centre. Twelve protesters were arrested. | |
| 20 February 2024 | London | 500 | Occupation of the media building of the Goldsmiths, University of London. Lasted at least until 25 February. | |
| 27 February 2024 | St. Helier | 60 | Demonstration in Royal Square, St Helier, Jersey to call for an immediate ceasefire in Gaza. | |
| 7 March 2024 | Leeds | ? | Occupation of the Parkinson Building of the University of Leeds. | |
| 8 March 2024 | Bristol | ? | Occupation of the Victoria Rooms of the University of Bristol. | |
| 8 March 2024 | London | ? | Occupation of the Professor Stuart Hall building of the Goldsmiths, University of London as an escalation of the action started on the 20 February. | |
| 9 March 2024 | London | 400,000 | Demonstration and march through the city centre. | |
| 19 March 2024 | Bristol | ? | Occupation of the Wills Memorial Building of the University of Bristol. | |
| 19 March 2024 | Douglas | 60 | Demonstration by the Manx branch of Amnesty International outside of the Tynwald building in Douglas, Isle of Man. | |
| 25 March 2024 | London | ? | Encampment at the campus of the University College London. Lasted at least until 26 April. | |
| 22 April 2024 | Leicester | ? | Demonstration at the University of Leicester. | |
| 22 April 2024 | Leicester | ? | Demonstration outside the Elbit Systems UK drone factory. | |
| 26 April 2024 | Coventry | ? | Encampment at the campus piazza of the University of Warwick. The encampment was later moved to outside Warwick's Senate House. Lasted until 26 June. Ended by protesters disbanding on their own. | |
| 1 May 2024 | Manchester | ? | Encampment at the University of Manchester. Lasted until 17 June. Ended by protesters disbanding on their own. | |
| 1 May 2024 | Leeds | ? | Encampment at the University of Leeds. Lasted until 19 June. Ended by protesters disbanding on their own under threat of legal action. | |
| 1 May 2024 | Sheffield | ? | Encampment at the University of Sheffield and the Sheffield Hallam University. Lasted until 23 September. Ended by protesters being evicted and relocated to a nearby park. | |
| 1 May 2024 | London | ? | Encampment at the University College. Protesters also occupied the library at Goldsmiths. On 3 May, Goldsmiths agreed to the protester's demands, naming a building after Palestinian journalist Shireen Abu Akleh, review the University's policy regarding the IHRA working definition of antisemitism, and to erect an installation on campus memorialising the protest. | |
| 1 May 2024 | Newcastle upon Tyne | 40-200 | Encampment at the Newcastle University. Lasted at least until 24 June. | |
| 4 May 2024 | Skipton | 100 | Demonstration and march through the town centre. | |
| 6 May 2024 | Old Aberdeen | ? | Encampment at the King's College campus of the University of Aberdeen. | |
| 6 May 2024 | Oxford | 200 | Encampment at the lawn of the Oxford University Museum of Natural History of the Oxford University. Lasted until 25 June. Ended by protesters disbanding on their own. | |
| 7 May 2024 | Belfast | ? | Sit-in at Queen's University Belfast. Among other demands, protesters called for Hillary Clinton to be removed as the university's chancellor. | |
| 8 May 2024 | Liverpool | ? | Encampment at Abercromby Square at the University of Liverpool and unofficially renamed after the murdered Gazan poet Refaat Alareer. | |
| 8 May 2024 | Bangor | ? | Encampment at Bangor University. | |
| 9 May 2024 | Lancaster, Lancashire | 10-15 | Encampment at Alexandra Square of the Lancaster University. | |
| 10 May 2024 | Durham | 15-20 | Encampment at Durham University. Lasted until 21 June. Ended by protesters disbanding on their own. | |
| 10 May 2024 | Nottingham | 40 | Encampment outside the Advanced Manufacturing building on Jubilee Campus of the University of Nottingham. | |
| 13 May 2024 | London | ? | Encampment at Queen Mary University of London. | |
| 13 May 2024 | Sussex | 50 | Encampment at the Library Square of the University of Sussex. | |
| 14 May 2024 | Cardiff | ? | Encampment at Cardiff University. | |
| 14 May 2024 | Lincoln | ? | Encampment in front of the Lincoln Arts Centre of the University of Lincoln. | |
| 14 May 2024 | Falmouth, Cornwall | ? | Encampment at the Penryn Campus of the University of Exeter and Falmouth University. | |
| 14 May 2024 | Exeter | ? | Encampment at the Streatham campus of the University of Exeter. | |
| 14 May 2024 | London | 500 | Encampment at the Marshall Hall of the London School of Economics. Lasted until 17 June following a court order for eviction. | |
| 15 May 2024 | York | ? | Encampment at the University of York. | |
| 15 May 2024 | Cambridge | 100 | Demonstration outside of Trinity College, Cambridge to protest against the college's alleged complicity in the Gaza war, holding up signs like "Trinity College funds genocide" and "Gaza has been held hostage for 107 years". | |
| 18 May 2024 | London | ? | Demonstration and march through the city centre on the occasion of the 76th anniversary of the Nakba. | |
| 18 May 2024 | Oxford | 50 | Die-in and disruption of a graduation ceremony at the Sheldonian Theatre. | |
| 18 May 2024 | Chester | 200 | Demonstration at Town Hall Square in Chester. | |
| 19 May 2024 | Oxford | ? | Encampment outside the Radcliffe Camera on Radcliffe Square. The Bodleian Library responded by limiting access via the Gladstone Link. Lasted until 8 July. Ended by protesters disbanding on their own under threat of legal action. | |
| 20 May 2024 | Reading | ? | Encampment at the University of Reading. | |
| 23 May 2024 | Oxford | ? | Demonstration at Oxford University. Protesters occupied the office building of Vice-Chancellor Irene Tracey, overlooking Wellington Square, hanging a Palestinian flag and list of demands out of an office window. Ended with police intervention. 17 protesters were arrested. | |
| 23 May 2024 | Oxford | 100 | Demonstration in support of the protesters arrested at Oxford University. Ended with police intervention. Some protesters were injured, including a student suffering a concussion and an elderly lady being knocked over. | |
| 27 May 2024 | London | ? | Encampment at Imperial College London. Lasted until 20 June. Ended by protesters disbanding on their own. | |
| 27 May 2024 | Manchester | ? | Occupation inside the Whitworth Hall of the University of Manchester, disrupting exams that were due to take place in the building. | |
| 27 May 2024 | Aberystwyth | 20 | Sit-in at library of the Aberystwyth University. Lasted until 3 June. | |
| 6 August 2024 | Bristol | 6 | Breaking into headquarters of Elbit Systems by Palestine Action activists, damaging equipment and spraying red paint on materials. Ended with police intervention. Two police officers were injured. Six protesters were arrested. | |
| 21 September 2024 | Brighton | 500 | Demonstration and march through the city centre. Protesters carried a 500-meter-long red banner symbolising the red line that Israel had crossed. | |
| 5 October 2024 | London | 5,000 | Demonstration and march through the city centre. Ended with police intervention. Fifteen protesters were arrested. | |
| 14 November 2024 | Belfast | 100 | Demonstration outside Ulster University's Belfast campus during a visit of Prince William. | |
| 14 November 2024 | Belfast | 200 | Demonstration outside Queen's University Belfast during a visit of Hillary Clinton. Ended with police intervention. Four protesters were arrested. | |
| 30 November 2024 | London | 125,000 | Demonstration and march through the city centre, starting from Park Lane carrying Palestinian and Lebanese flags with signs condemning Benjamin Netanyahu and calling for his arrest. | |
| 1 December 2024 | Armagh | 30 | Pro-Palestine protestors interrupted a service at St Patrick's Cathedral to "highlight the silence from the Catholic church on genocide in Palestine". | |

=== 2025 ===
| Date | City/town | Estimated attendance | Description | Ref(s) |
|---|---|---|---|---|
| 18 January 2025 | London | 100,000 | Demonstration and march through the city centre. 77 protesters were arrested. | |
| 24 January 2025 | Oxford | 100-150 | Occupation of the Radcliffe Camera of the Oxford University. Ended with police intervention. 13 protesters were arrested. | |
| 15 February 2025 | London | 150,000 | Demonstration and march through the city centre against Donald Trump's February 2025 proposal for the Gaza Strip. | |
| 8 March 2025 | London | ? | Dozens of pro-Palestine demonstrators marched near the Houses of Parliament after the police blocked a rally planned near the BBC's headquarters. | |
| 15 March 2025 | London | 55,000 | Demonstration and march through the city centre. | |
| 21 March 2025 | Glasgow | ? | Defacing of the offices of Keysight Technologies and Allianz with red paint. | |
| 5 April 2025 | London | 40 | Blocking of car traffic near King's Cross station. Ended with police intervention. | |
| 6 April 2025 | London | 50 | Human chain at the corner of Oxford Street and Wonderland Road. | |
| 12 April 2025 | Shipley, West Yorkshire | 300 | Demonstration outside weapons manufacturer Teledyne Technologies. | |
| 17 May 2025 | London | 600,000 | Demonstration and march through the city centre on the occasion of the 77th anniversary of the Nakba and calling for the government to 'take action' to stop the atrocities against Palestinians. | |
| 24 May 2025 | York | 100+ | Demonstration and march in the city centre. | |
| 29 May 2025 | London | ? | Vigil at Elizabeth Tower outside of the Palace of Westminster where activists including Steve Coogan, Toby Jones, and Juliet Stevenson read out the names of more than 16,000 children that were killed in Gaza. Lasted more than 18 hours. | |
| 4 June 2025 | London | 5,000 | March outside of the Parliament of the United Kingdom while wearing red to create a "Red Line for Palestine", demanded that the government impose an arms embargo and sanctions against Israel. | |
| 17 June 2025 | Plymouth | ? | Demonstration outside of Plymouth MP Luke Pollard's office, calling the government to impose an arms embargo on exports and military aid to Israel. | |
| 20 June 2025 | Oxfordshire | 5 | Defacing of two Voyager aircraft with crowbars and repurposing of a fire extinguisher to spray red paint to the planes and the runway of the Brize Norton Royal Air Force base. Five activists from Palestine Action were later arrested in connection to this direct action. | |
| 21 June 2025 | London | 1,000+ | Demonstration from Russell Square to Whitehall, calling for the end of the war in Gaza and war in Iran. | |
| 12 July 2025 | Birmingham | 100+ | Demonstration and march through the city centre. | |
| 22 July 2025 | Exmouth | 89 | A vigil was held in the town's seafront to highlight the Gaza humanitarian crisis. | |
| 24 July 2025 | Margate | 200 | Demonstration and march through the town centre to protest the starvation of Palestinians in the Gaza Strip. | |
| 1 August 2025 | Kidderminster | ? | Demonstration in the town centre. | |
| 3 August 2025 | Keswick | 200 | Demonstration in the town centre. | |
| 5 August 2025 | Weymouth | 100+ | Demonstration in the town's seafront. | |
| 9 August 2025 | London | 500 | Demonstration at the Parliament Square to protest against the ongoing genocide in Gaza and in opposition to the banning of Palestine Action. Ended with police intervention. 446 protesters were arrested. | |
| 10 August 2025 | Derry | 100+ | Demonstration in support of Gaza and Palestine at Guildhall, Derry. | |
| 26 August 2025 | Wolverhampton | 4 | Rooftop protest at the Wolverhampton factory of Moog Inc. by four activists, subsequently known as the Moog 4, who claimed to be disrupting the export of military aircraft parts to Israel. All four protesters were removed from the roof and arrested. | |
| 30 August 2025 | Southend-on-Sea | 50 | Demonstration and march through the city centre. | |
| 6 September 2025 | London | 1,500 | Demonstrators clashed with police outside of the Parliament of the United Kingdom to protest against the ban of Palestine Action group. 890 people were arrested. | |
| 12 September 2025 | Bolton | ? | Demonstration in the town centre. | |
| 23 September 2025 | Douglas | ? | Demonstration organised by Amnesty International and Caarjyn Palestine outside of Comis Hotel during a conference by Manx government. | |
| 23 September 2025 | Leicester | 6 | Demonstration outside drone factory of UAV Tactical Systems whose majority shareholder is Elbit Systems. Ended with police intervention. Six protesters were arrested. | |
| 24 September 2025 | Darlington | ? | Demonstration and vigil held in the town centre. | |
| 28 September 2025 | Liverpool | 66 | At least 66 protestors were arrested for showing support to Palestine Action during a demonstration outside the Labour Party conference in Liverpool. | |
| 4 October 2025 | London | 1,000 | Demonstration at the Trafalgar Square in support of Palestine Action. Ended with police intervention. 488 protesters were arrested, the oldest being 89 years old. | |
| 7 October 2025 | Belfast | ? | Demonstration inside the Belfast City Hall. | |
| 7 October 2025 | London | 500 | Walkout by students of the King's College London, the London School of Economics, University College London and School of Oriental and African Studies. | |
| 11 October 2025 | London | 50,000 | Demonstration and march through the city centre. Protesters shouted "Free Palestine" and "Death, death to the IDF". A small group of pro-Israeli counter-demonstrators infiltrated the march. Ended with police intervention. 14 protesters were arrested. | |
| 21 October 2025 | Leicester | 14 | Demonstration outside drone factory of UAV Tactical Systems. Ended with police intervention. | |
| 2 November 2025 | HM Prison Pentonville and HM Prison Bronzefield | 8 | A hunger strike by people imprisoned for activity related to Palestine Action began in November 2025, the largest hunger strike in the UK since the 1981 Irish hunger strike. It led to the hospitalisation of several prisoners. | |
| 6 November 2025 | Birmingham | 500 | Demonstration outside Villa Park against Maccabi Tel Aviv F.C.. Ended with police intervention. Eleven protesters were arrested. | |
| 7 November 2025 | Edinburgh | ? | Breaking into an office of electronics firm Keysight Technologies which is linked to Thales and Elbit Systems. The activists damaged windows, lighting, and air-conditioning units, and spray painted both the inside and outside of the building. | |
| 12 November 2025 | Berkshire | 2 | Occupation of the roof of electronics firm Keysight Technologies in Winnersh. Ended with police intervention. Two protesters were arrested. | |
| 18 November 2025 | Truro | 7 | Seven protestors were arrested by police during a demonstration outside Truro Cathedral for supporting Palestine Action. | |
| 18 November 2025 | Northampton | 9 | Nine people were arrested by police for supporting the lifting of a ban of Palestine Action during a protest organised by the Defend Our Juries. | |
| 20 November 2025 | London | ? | Demonstration outside the Ministry of Justice building in Westminster in support of Palestine Action. Ended with police intervention. 47 protesters were arrested. | |
| 22 November 2025 | London | ? | Demonstration at the Trafalgar Square in support of Palestine Action. Protesters held signs with messages such as "I oppose genocide, I support Palestine Action". Ended with police intervention. 90 protesters were arrested. | |
| 26 November 2025 | London | 150 | Demonstration outside the High Court in support of Palestine Action. Some protesters were arrested. | |
| 29 November 2025 | London | 5,000 | Demonstration and march through the city centre. | |
| 17 December 2025 | London | ? | Demonstration outside the Ministry of Justice in Westminster in solidarity with the detainees linked to Palestine Action who were on a hunger strike for a month. Four protesters were arrested for chanting "globalise the Intifada". | |
| 23 December 2025 | London | ? | Demonstration in solidarity with the detainees linked to Palestine Action who were on a hunger strike for a month. Greta Thunberg was arrested. | |
| 28 December 2025 | Belfast | ? | Demonstration outside the Royal Courts of Justice, Belfast in support of the Palestine Action hunger strikers. | |

=== 2026 ===
| Date | City/town | Estimated attendance | Description | Ref(s) |
|---|---|---|---|---|
| 1 January 2026 | Belfast | 100+ | Hundreds of people gathered in Belfast to show solidarity with Palestine Action hunger strikers. | |
| 25 January 2026 | London | 86 | Police arrested 86 demonstrators after suspected of breaching the grounds of HM Prison Wormwood Scrubs during a protest in solidarity with a Palestine Action hunger striker. | |
| 31 January 2026 | London | 50,000 | Demonstration and march through the city centre. | |
| 7 March 2026 | London | 5,000–6,000 | Demonstration through the city centre and march towards the US Embassy. | |
| 15 March 2026 | London | 100+ | Hundreds of people joined a pro-Palestine march on Quds Day despite the government's ban after it was organised by a group "supportive of the Iranian regime", according to the Metropolitan Police. Twelve people were later arrested by police after, according to Metropolitan police assistant commissioner, Ade Adelekan, for "showing support for a proscribed organisation, affray and for threatening or abusive behaviour. We are also investigating chants made by a speaker at the al-Quds protest." | |
| 28 March 2026 | London | 50,000–500,000 | A pro-Palestine protest organised by the Palestine Coalition was joined by a separate anti-far right demonstration in central London organised by the Together Alliance. | |
| 11 April 2026 | London | 523 | Demonstration opposing the proscription of Palestine Action - the first since the ban was ruled unlawful by the high court. Ended with police intervention. 523 protesters were arrested, ranging from 18 to 87 year old. | |
| 12 April 2026 | Hampshire | 3 | Breaking into the US-owned Keysight Technologies research and development plant which manufactures radar and electronic warfare systems for military use for Israel. The activists sprayed walls with red paint and destroyed computers, servers, and machinery. The three protesters were arrested. | |
| 24 April 2026 | Leicester | ? | Occupation of the roof and breaking into Elbit owned factory of UAV Tactical Systems. | |
| 2 May 2026 | Craven Arms | 20 | Demonstration in solidarity with the Palestinians in Gaza, West Bank and East Jerusalem. | |
| 16 May 2026 | London | 30,000–250,000 | Demonstration to commemorate Nakba Day and as a counter protest against the far-right Unite the Kingdom rally organised by far-right activist Tommy Robinson. | |
| 31 May 2026 | Turnberry | ? | Several pro-Palestine demonstrators staged a protest outside Donald Trump's Trump Turnberry. According to a spokesperson of the Gaza Genocide Emergency Committee, the protest was a response to Trump's "genocidal killing in Gaza, illegal wars in the Middle East, fascist ICE policing, and fearful insecurity across the world." | |
| 6 June 2026 | Scarva | ? | A march held by the Ireland-Palestine Solidarity Campaign (IPSC) from Scarva to Newry, representing the length of the Gaza Strip, around 40 km. A pro-Israel counter protest was also held that same day. | |
| 14 June 2026 | London | 100+ | A pro-Palestine demonstration was held outside of the Great Israeli Real Estate Event to protest against the sale of properties in the West Bank, chanting slogans and posters reading, "Stop Israel’s illegal sale of stolen Palestinian land" and "Thou shalt not steal". A pro-Israel counterprotest was also held in support of the event. In the end, at least 14 people were arrested by the Metropolitan Police. | |
| 3 July 2026 | London | 14 | Fourteen activists were arrested by police after staging a demonstration in central London to mark the one-year anniversary of Palestine Action was proscribed as a banned organisation. | |
| 12 July 2026 | York | ? | Several Christians staged a protest, urging the Church of England to recognized the Gaza genocide and to formally engaged with the Kairos Palestine II document which calls for the isolation of Israel by the church. | |
| 18 July 2026 | London | 1,000+ | The protest was organized by the Palestine Coalition, demanding the incoming Prime Minister Andy Burnham to take more immediate actions against Israel's actions in Gaza. | |
| 30 July 2026 | London | 117 | Dozens of people staged a demonstration outside of a courthouse in London to show support for Palestine Action. According to the Metropolitan Police, around 117 people were arrested for "expressing support for a proscribed organization." | |
| 9 September 2026 | Glasgow | ? | Several protestors staged a demonstration outside the Sentinel Building to protest Chubb Limited's alleged ties to Elbit Systems. | |
| 27 September 2026 | Liverpool | 250 | Demonstration outside of a Labour Party conference to show support for Palestine Action. More than 50 protestors were arrested by police, one of those was Robert Del Naja, English musician and member of the trip hop group, Massive Attack. | |
| 7 October 2026 | London | ? | At least five people were arrested by police on suspicion of inciting racial hatred during a protest outside the office of the Board of Deputies of British Jews in London. | |
| 7 October 2026 | London | 100 | Demonstration and march between Lincoln's Inn to Russell Square. Five protestors were arrested for breaching conditions imposed during the march and another person was detained by police on suspicion of common assault. | |
| 8 October 2026 | Braunstone Town | 35 | A demonstration supporting Palestine Action was held outside of a building in Meridian Way. At least 35 protestors were arrested by police under Section 13 of the Terrorism Act 2000. | |
| 10 October 2026 | London | 7,000–250,000 | Demonstration in the city centre to commemorate the third year anniversary of the Gaza genocide since October 2023. | |
| 10 October 2026 | Edinburgh | 1,000+ | Demonstration and march through the city centre. | |
| 31 October 2026 | London | 325 | Demonstration outside of the US embassy in London to protest against the genocide in Gaza and in support of Palestine Action. The Metropolitan Police later arrested at least 325 demonstrators, 320 of them for "expressing support for a proscribed organisation under the Terrorism Act". | |

== See also ==
- Gaza war protests
- Gaza war protests in the United Kingdom
- United Kingdom and the Gaza war
- Boycott, Divestment, and Sanctions
- Lists of pro-Palestinian protests
