= Nathaniel Crynes =

English antiquary and physician

Rev. Nathaniel Crynes
- Born: c. 1685; Coventry
- Died: August 5, 1745
- Education: King Henry VIII Grammar School
- Occupations: Antiquary, physician

Rev. Nathaniel Crynes (1685/6-1745), was an English antiquary, physician and Fellow of St John's College, Oxford.

== Life ==
Crynes was born in Coventry to Jonah and Sarah Crynes. He was educated at King Henry VIII Grammar School in Coventry, matriculating at St John's in 1704. He received a BA in 1708 and an MA in 1712. In 1716 the university appointed Crynes Superior Bedel of Arts and Physic, and he held this position until his death. Crynes gave up his Fellowship at St John's in late 1716, thereafter practising as a physician in Coventry. He died, most likely in Coventry, on 5 August 1745.

== Collections ==
Crynes was an active collector of books and manuscripts, amassing a large library that spanned a range of subjects and included many rare works. On his death, as stipulated in his will, Crynes bequeathed to the Bodleian Library the books in his collection that it did not already own. This amounted to 968 volumes in octavo and smaller sizes (with a few quartos) dating from the 16th to 18th centuries, many of which are very scarce. Crynes also gifted St John's with around 1,500 volumes, including eleven works produced by William Caxton – some of the earliest volumes to be printed in English. The rest of Crynes books were divided equally between Balliol and Lincoln colleges.

In addition to the 968 volumes bequeathed to the Bodleian Library in Crynes's will – which are kept together on its shelves as the Crynes collection – the Bodleian holds many of Crynes's folios, more than twenty of his incunabula and eighteen manuscripts. The latter comprise philosophical, theological and literary works and Biblical and legal documents in English, French and Latin dating from between the 11th and 18th centuries. Three such manuscripts were purchased from Crynes in 1723, seven were presented by him in 1736, and eight were bequeathed in 1745. In total the Bodleian owns 1,201 items from Crynes's collection.

Crynes was a friend and coadjutor of Richard Rawlinson, who was also a Fellow of St John's; the two shared antiquarian interests and helped each other in their collecting. This perhaps explains how Crynes's library came to include a wide range of historical material that significantly supplemented the Bodleian's collections. In addition to a large quantity of rare English work, Crynes collected many 16th-century octavo European editions, which the Bodleian had previously overlooked in favour of the larger folio volumes preferred by Thomas Bodley himself for public use in his library.

Crynes's collecting interests were well known in Oxford in his time, and the expectation that his books would be of significant scholarly interest is evidenced by the speed with which they were organised for use. Within a few months of his death the books were arranged and catalogued, and by July 1746 they were being ordered by readers by their Crynes numbers.

In 1727, Crynes purchased some duplicates from the Bodleian for £3 16s. 8d. Thomas Warton, in his 1785 edition of Milton's Poems Upon Several Occasions (1673), provides an account of the purchase in which Crynes, a loyal royalist and churchman, rejects an opportunity to acquire two volumes of Milton's poetry and prose that Milton himself had gifted to the library in 1646:

About the year 1720, these two volumes, with other small books, were hastily, perhaps contemptuously thrown aside as duplicates, either real or pretended: and Mr. Nathaniel Crynes, an esquire beadle, and a diligent collector of scarce English books, was permitted, on the promise of some future valuable bequests to the library, to pick out of the heap what he pleased. But he, having luckily many more grains of party prejudice than of taste, could not think any thing worth having that bore the name of the republican Milton, and therefore these two curiosities, which would be invaluable in a modern auction, were fortunately suffered to remain in the library, and were soon afterwards honourably restored to their original place.

The story is likely to be apocryphal, since Crynes did in fact collect Milton's political writings where he could find them: the Bodleian copies of Defensio Secunda (1654) and Pro Se Defensio (1655) were both once owned by him and are now marked Crynes 272 and 273 respectively.
