= Gladstone Link =

Underground library in Oxford, England

- Interactive map of the Gladstone Link area

General information
- Location: Oxford, England
- Coordinates: 51.7537°N 1.2541°W
- Affiliation: Bodleian Library

The Gladstone Link, informally known as the Glink, is an underground library of the University of Oxford, that connects the Bodleian Library with the Radcliffe Camera. It was developed and opened to readers on 5 July 2011. It is named after former Prime Minister William Gladstone, who had also studied at Christ Church. It is more modern than traditional Oxford Libraries, many of which are members of the Bodleian Libraries.

== History ==
The tunnels in which the library is now located were previously the Underground Bookstore. The tunnels were used for transporting books between the Old Bodleian and New Bodleian libraries (now Weston Library) and to the Radcliffe Camera. The books were transported via conveyor; a section of this system is preserved in the New Bodleian tunnel.

When the New Bodleian was developed into the Weston Library, a shift to open shelving was made so that the transportation of books from the vaults was no longer needed. This development changed the way books and materials were moved around the Central Bodleian Complex. This system of movement, however, is now being refurbished and reinstated. Since the Weston Library stores delicate and rare materials, the tunnel will be used to prevent these materials from facing exposure to the elements during their transportation.

== Layout ==
The Gladstone Link has two levels, the upper and lower levels. The Gladstone Link is accessed via the lower reading room in the Radcliffe Camera. A platform lift provides greater access for readers with disabilities. From the Bodleian side, access is available via a tunnel from the north staircase.

The Upper Gladstone Link is home to the History Faculty main lending library, which continues from the Lower Camera Reading Room.

The Lower Gladstone Link houses a collection of widely read Bodleian library material that was previously only available by request off closed stacks.
