= Bodleian Library =

Research library of the University of Oxford

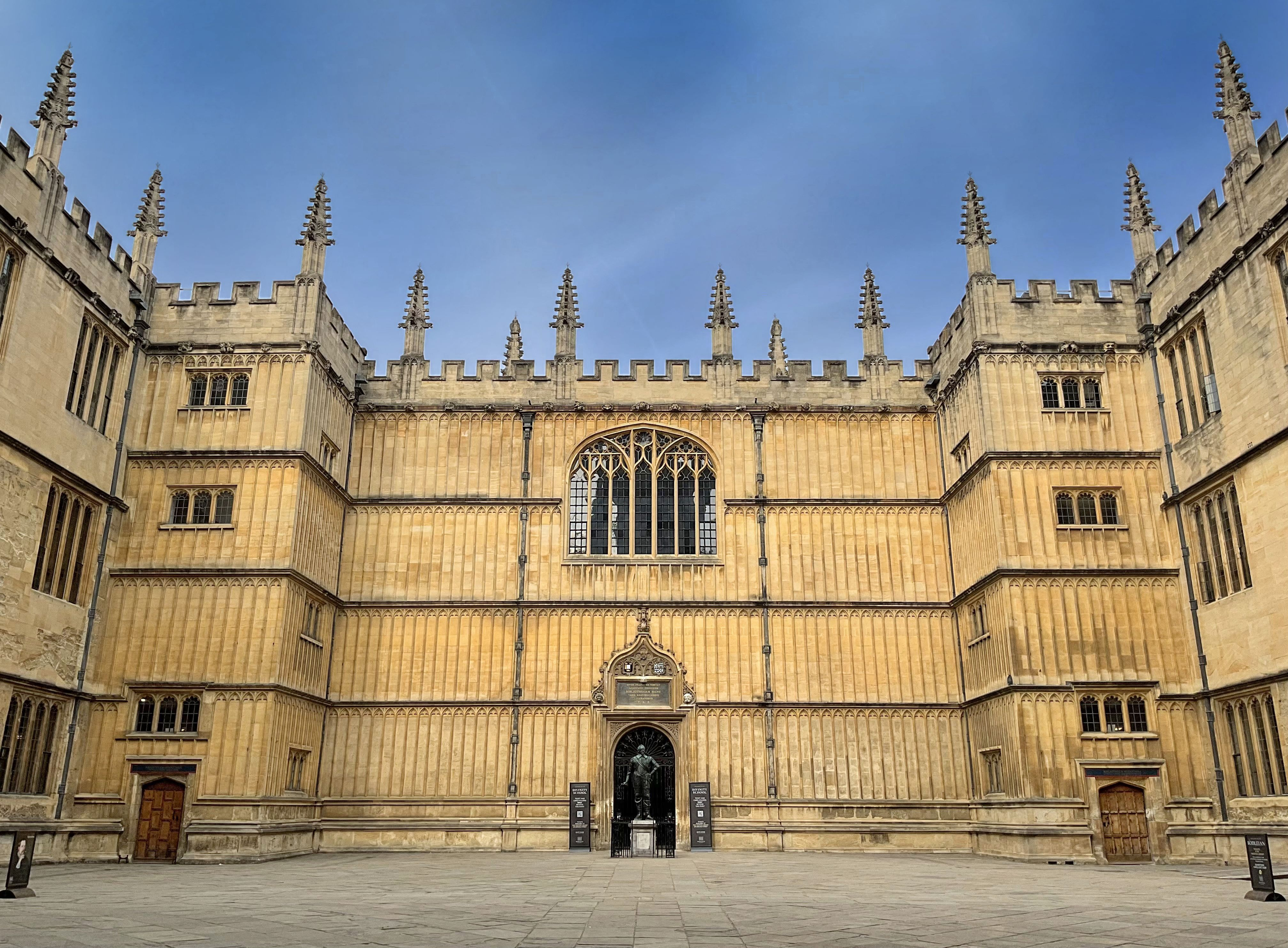
- Bodleian Library
- 51°45′14″N 1°15′16″W
- Location: Broad Street, Oxford, United Kingdom
- Type: Academic library
- Established: 1602; 424 years ago

Collection
- Items collected: Books, journals, newspapers, magazines, sound and music recordings, maps, prints, drawings and manuscripts
- Size: 13M+
- Legal deposit: Included in the Legal Deposit Libraries Act 2003

Access and use
- Access requirements: Old Schools Quadrangle, Divinity School, Exhibition Room and Bodleian Library Gift Shop open to the public
- Members: Students and fellows of University of Oxford

Other information
- Director: Richard Ovenden
- Website: bodleian.ox.ac.uk/bodley

The Bodleian Library (/ˈbɒdliən, bɒdˈliːən/) is the main research library of the University of Oxford. Founded in 1602 by Sir Thomas Bodley, it is one of the oldest libraries in Europe. With over 13 million printed items, it is the second-largest library in Britain after the British Library. Under the Legal Deposit Libraries Act 2003, it is one of six legal deposit libraries for works published in the United Kingdom, and under Irish law it is entitled to request a copy of each book published in the Republic of Ireland. Known to Oxford scholars as "Bodley" or "the Bod", it operates principally as a reference library and, in general, documents may not be removed from the reading rooms.

In 2000, a number of libraries within the University of Oxford were brought together for administrative purposes under the aegis of what was initially known as Oxford University Library Services (OULS), and since 2010 as the Bodleian Libraries, of which the Bodleian Library is the largest component.

All colleges of the University of Oxford have their own libraries, which in a number of cases were established well before the foundation of the Bodleian, and all of which remain entirely independent of the Bodleian. They do, however, participate in SOLO (Search Oxford Libraries Online), the Bodleian Libraries' online union catalogue, except for University College, which has an independent catalogue. Some of the library's archives were digitized and put online for public access in 2015.

== Sites and regulations ==
The Bodleian Library occupies a group of five buildings near Broad Street: the 15th-century Duke Humfrey's Library, the 17th-century Schools Quadrangle, the 18th-century Clarendon Building and Radcliffe Camera, and the 20th- and 21st-century Weston Library. Since the 19th century, underground stores have been constructed, while the principal off-site storage area is located at South Marston on the edge of Swindon.

=== Admission ===
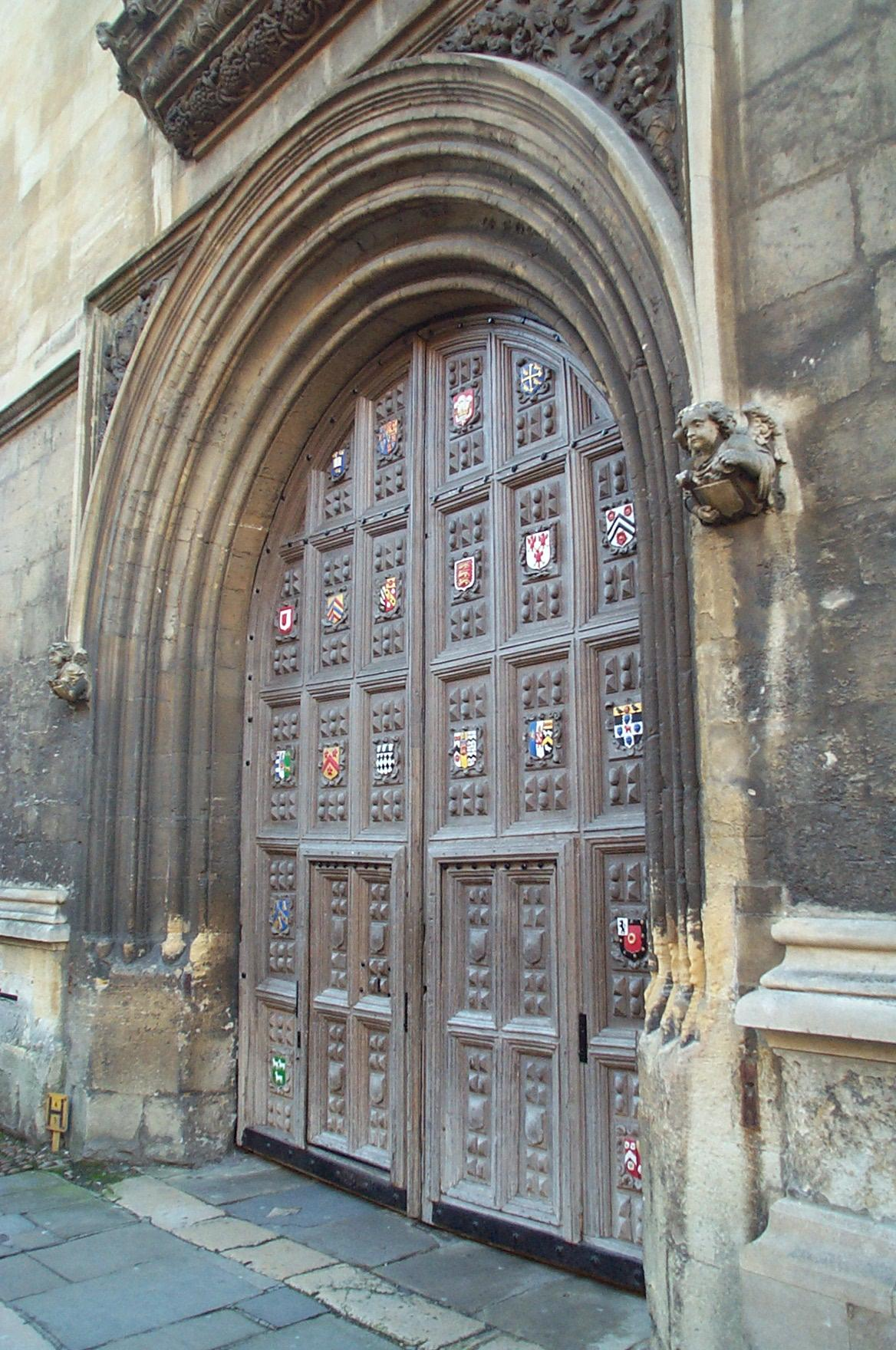
Door to the Bodleian's main entrance, with the coats of arms of several Oxford colleges

Before being granted access to the library, new readers are required to agree to a formal declaration. This declaration was traditionally an oral oath, but is now usually made by signing a letter to a similar effect. Ceremonies in which readers recite the declaration are still performed for those who wish to take them; these occur primarily at the start of the university's Michaelmas term. External readers (those not attached to the university) are still required to recite the declaration orally prior to admission. The Bodleian Admissions Office has amassed a large collection of translations of the declaration—covering over one hundred different languages as of spring 2017—allowing those who are not native English speakers to recite it in their first language. The English text of the declaration is as follows:

I hereby undertake not to remove from the Library, nor to mark, deface, or injure in any way, any volume, document or other object belonging to it or in its custody; not to bring into the Library, or kindle therein, any fire or flame, and not to smoke in the Library; and I promise to obey all rules of the Library.

This is a translation of the traditional Latin oath (the original version of which did not forbid tobacco smoking, though libraries were then unheated because fires were so hazardous):

Do fidem me nullum librum vel instrumentum aliamve quam rem ad bibliothecam pertinentem, vel ibi custodiae causa depositam, aut e bibliotheca sublaturum esse, aut foedaturum deformaturum aliove quo modo laesurum; item neque ignem nec flammam in bibliothecam inlaturum vel in ea accensurum, neque fumo nicotiano aliove quovis ibi usurum; item promitto me omnes leges ad bibliothecam Bodleianam attinentes semper observaturum esse.

== History ==
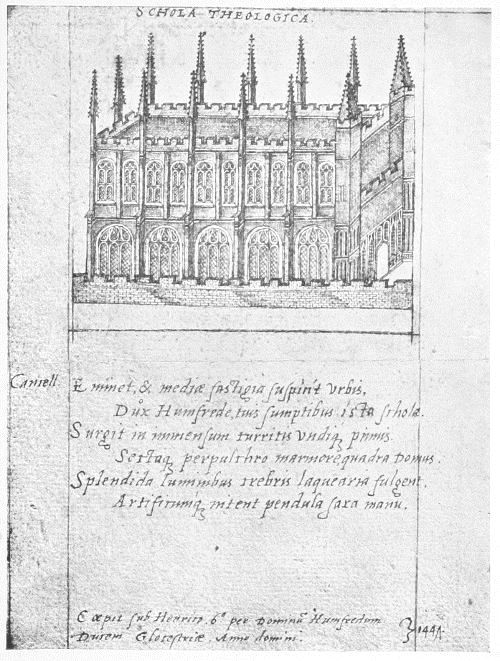
The library in 1566, drawn by John Bereblock and given to Queen Elizabeth I as part of a book when she first visited Oxford

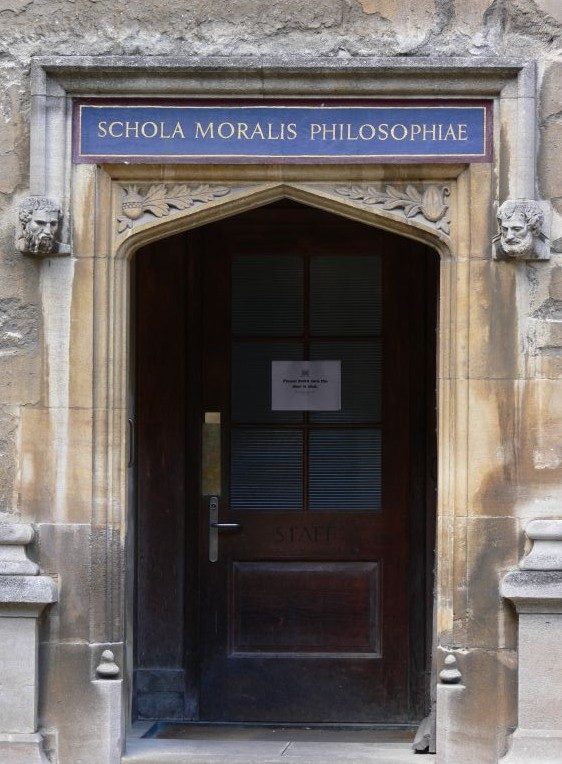
Doorway to the Schola Moralis Philosophiae (School of Moral Philosophy) at the Bodleian Library (now the staff entrance in the Schools Quadrangle)

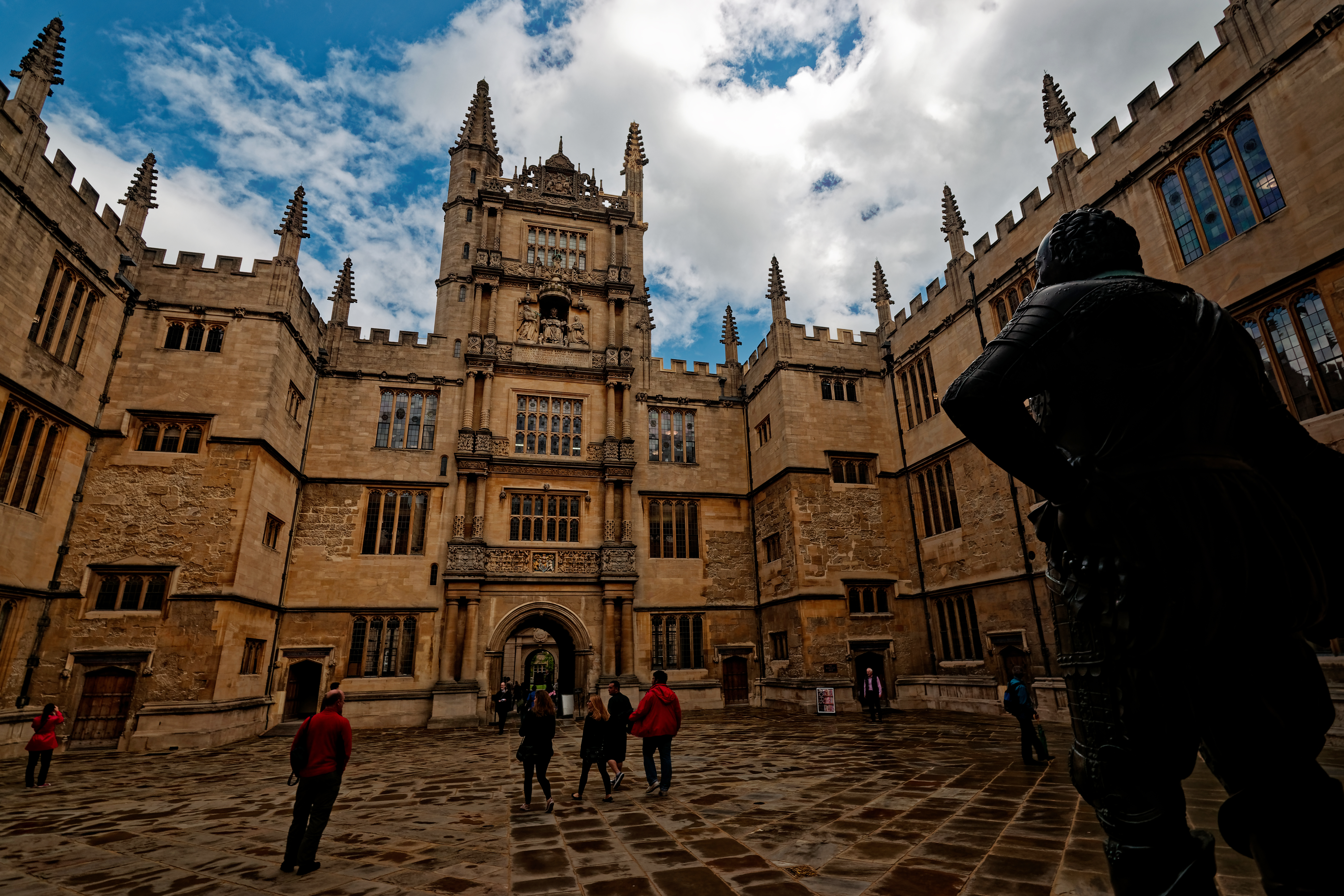
The Tower of the Five Orders, as viewed from the entrance to the Divinity School

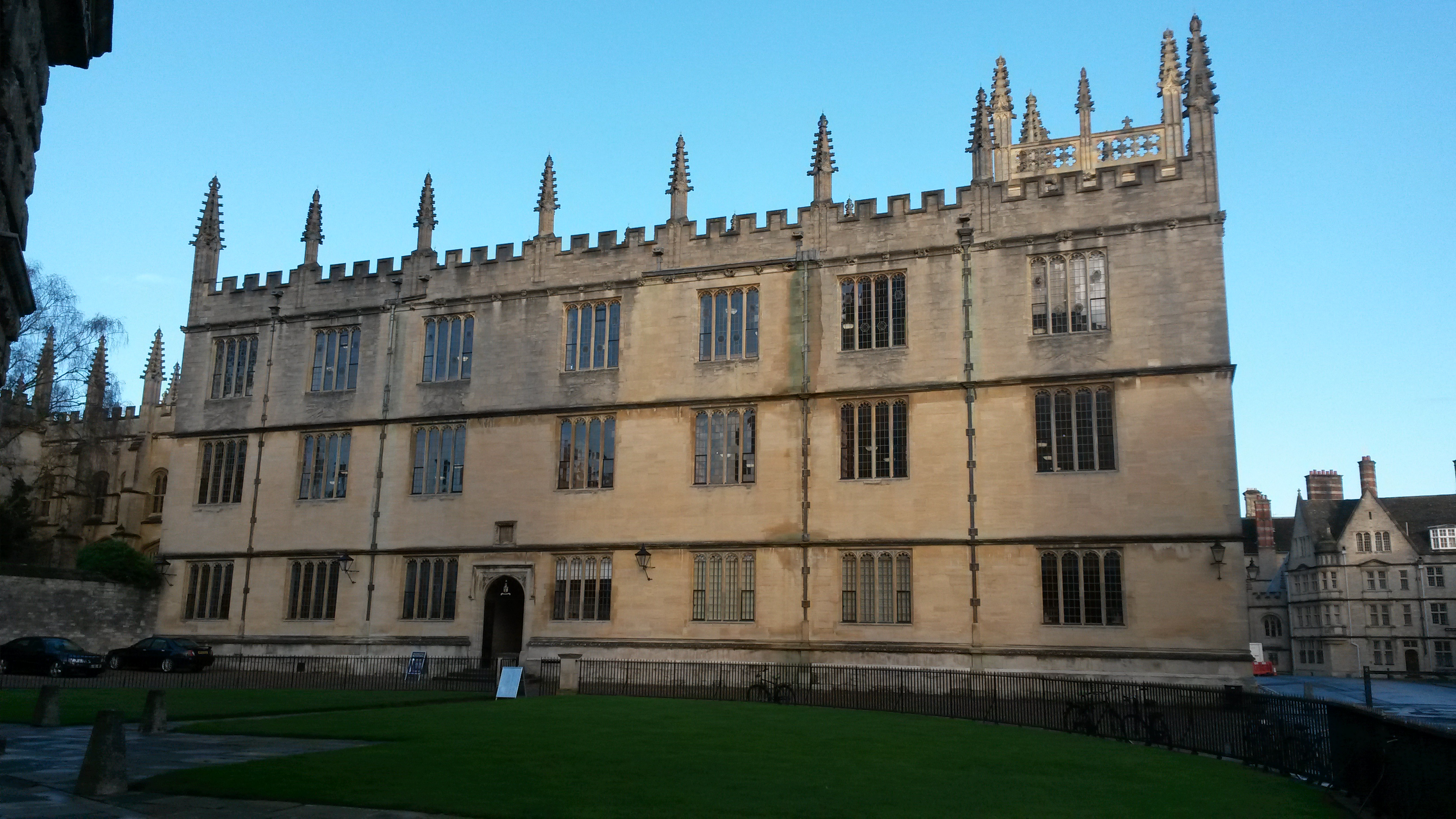
The Library seen from Radcliffe Square

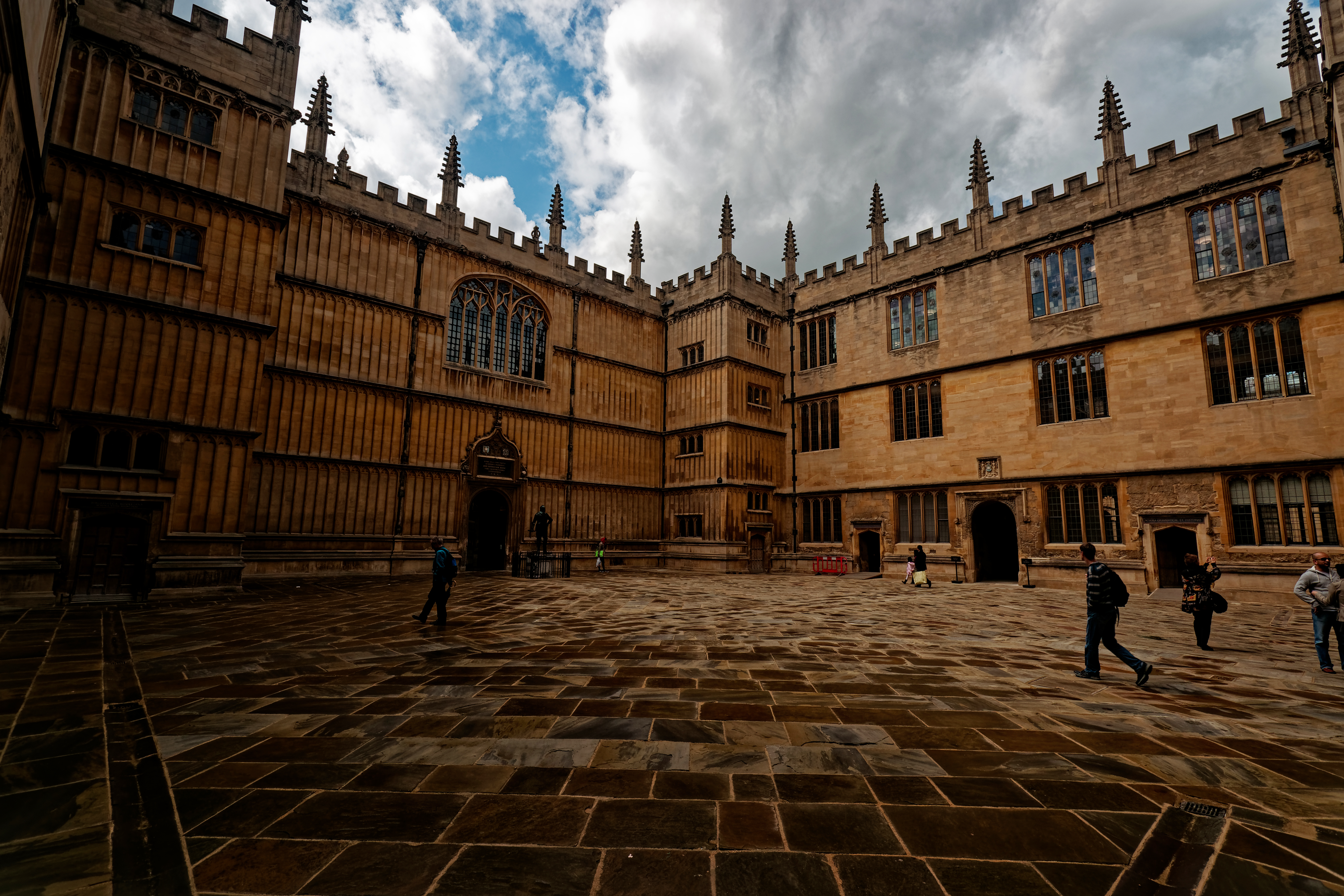
The courtyard of the Bodleian Library looking to the north entrance

=== 14th and 15th centuries ===
Whilst the Bodleian Library, in its current incarnation, has a continuous history dating back to 1602, its roots date back even further. The first purpose-built library known to have existed in Oxford was founded in the 14th century under the will of Thomas Cobham, Bishop of Worcester (d. 1327). This small collection of chained books was situated above the north side of the University Church of St Mary the Virgin on the High Street. This collection continued to grow steadily, but when Humphrey, Duke of Gloucester (brother of Henry V of England) donated a great collection of manuscripts between 1435 and 1437, the space was deemed insufficient and a larger building was required. A suitable room was finally built above the Divinity School, and completed in 1488. This room continues to be known as Duke Humfrey's Library. After 1488, the university stopped spending money on the library's upkeep and acquisitions, and manuscripts began to go unreturned to the library.

=== Sir Thomas Bodley and the re-founding of the University Library ===
The library went through a period of decline in the late 16th century: the library's furniture was sold, and only three of the original books belonging to Duke Humphrey remained in the collection. During the reign of Edward VI, there was a purge of "superstitious" (Catholic-related) manuscripts.

It was not until 1598 that the library began to thrive once more, when Thomas Bodley wrote to the Vice Chancellor of the university offering to support the development of the library: "where there hath bin hertofore a publike library in Oxford: which you know is apparent by the rome it self remayning, and by your statute records I will take the charge and cost upon me, to reduce it again to his former use."

Bodley was a former fellow of Merton College, who had recently married a wealthy widow, and the son of John Bodley (d. 15 October 1591) a Protestant merchant who chose foreign exile rather than staying in England under the Roman Catholic government of Queen Mary, and was thereby involved in Rowland Hill's publication of the Geneva Bible.

Six of the Oxford University dons were tasked with helping Bodley in refitting the library in March 1598. Duke Humfrey's Library was refitted, and Bodley donated some of his own books to furnish it. The library was formally re-opened on 8 November 1602 under the name "Bodleian Library" (officially Bodley's Library). There were around 2,000 books in the library at this time, with an ornate Benefactor's Register displayed prominently, to encourage donations. Early benefactors were motivated by the recent memory of the Reformation to donate books in the hopes that they would be kept safe.

Bodley's collecting interests were varied; according to the library's historian Ian Philip, as early as June 1603 he was attempting to source manuscripts from Turkey, and it was during "the same year that the first Chinese book was acquired", despite no-one at Oxford being able to understand them at that time. In 1605, Francis Bacon gave the library a copy of The Advancement of Learning and described the Bodleian as "an Ark to save learning from deluge". At this time, there were few books written in English held in the library, partially because academic work was not done in English. Thomas James suggested that Bodley should ask the Stationers' Company to provide a copy of all books printed to the Bodleian and in 1610 Bodley made an agreement with the company to put a copy of every book registered with them in the library. The Bodleian collection grew so fast that the building was expanded between 1610 and 1612 (known as the Arts End), and again in 1634–1637. When John Selden died in 1654, he left the Bodleian his large collection of books and manuscripts. The later addition to Duke Humfrey's Library continues to be known as the "Selden End".

By 1620, 16,000 items were in the Bodleian's collection. Anyone who wanted to use the Bodleian had to buy a copy of the 1620 library catalogue at a cost of 2 shillings and 8 pence.

=== Schools Quadrangle and Tower of the Five Orders ===
By the time of Bodley's death in 1613, his planned further expansion to the library was just starting. The Schools Quadrangle (sometimes referred to as the "Old Schools Quadrangle", or the "Old Library") was built between 1613 and 1619 by adding three wings to the Proscholium and Arts End. Its tower forms the main entrance to the library, and is known as the Tower of the Five Orders. The Tower is so named because it is ornamented, in ascending order, with the columns of each of the five orders of classical architecture: Tuscan, Doric, Ionic, Corinthian and Composite.

The three wings of the quadrangle have three floors: rooms on the ground and upper floors of the quadrangle (excluding Duke Humfrey's Library, above the Divinity School) were originally used as lecture space and an art gallery. The lecture rooms are still indicated by the inscriptions over the doors (see illustration). As the library's collections expanded, these rooms were gradually taken over, the university lectures and examinations were moved into the newly created University Schools building. The art collection was transferred to the Ashmolean. One of the schools was used to host exhibitions of the library's treasures, now moved to the renovated Weston Library, whilst the others are used as offices and meeting rooms for the library administrators, a readers' common room, and a small gift shop.

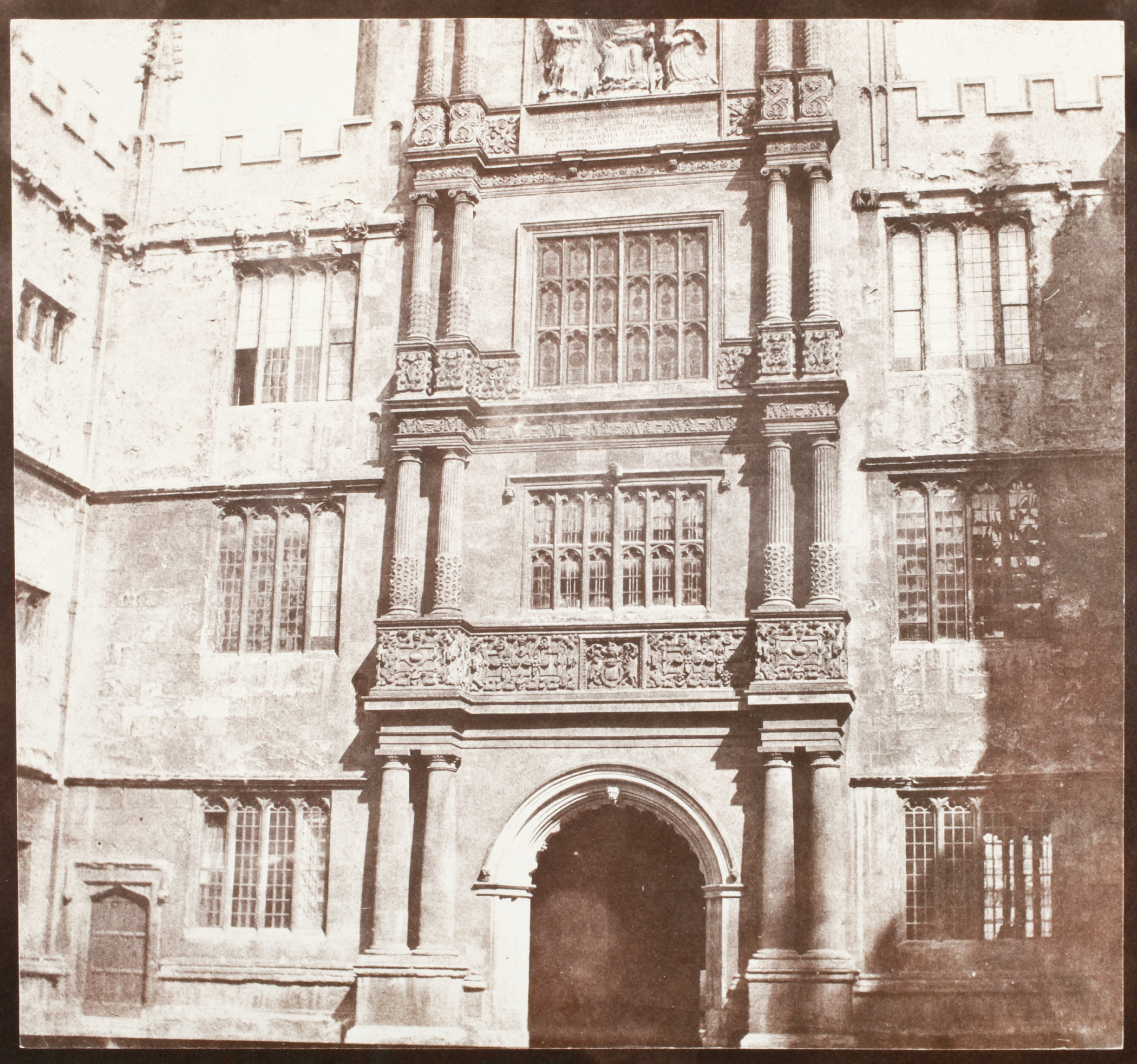
The Tower of the Five Orders photographed by Henry Fox Talbot, c. 1843/46

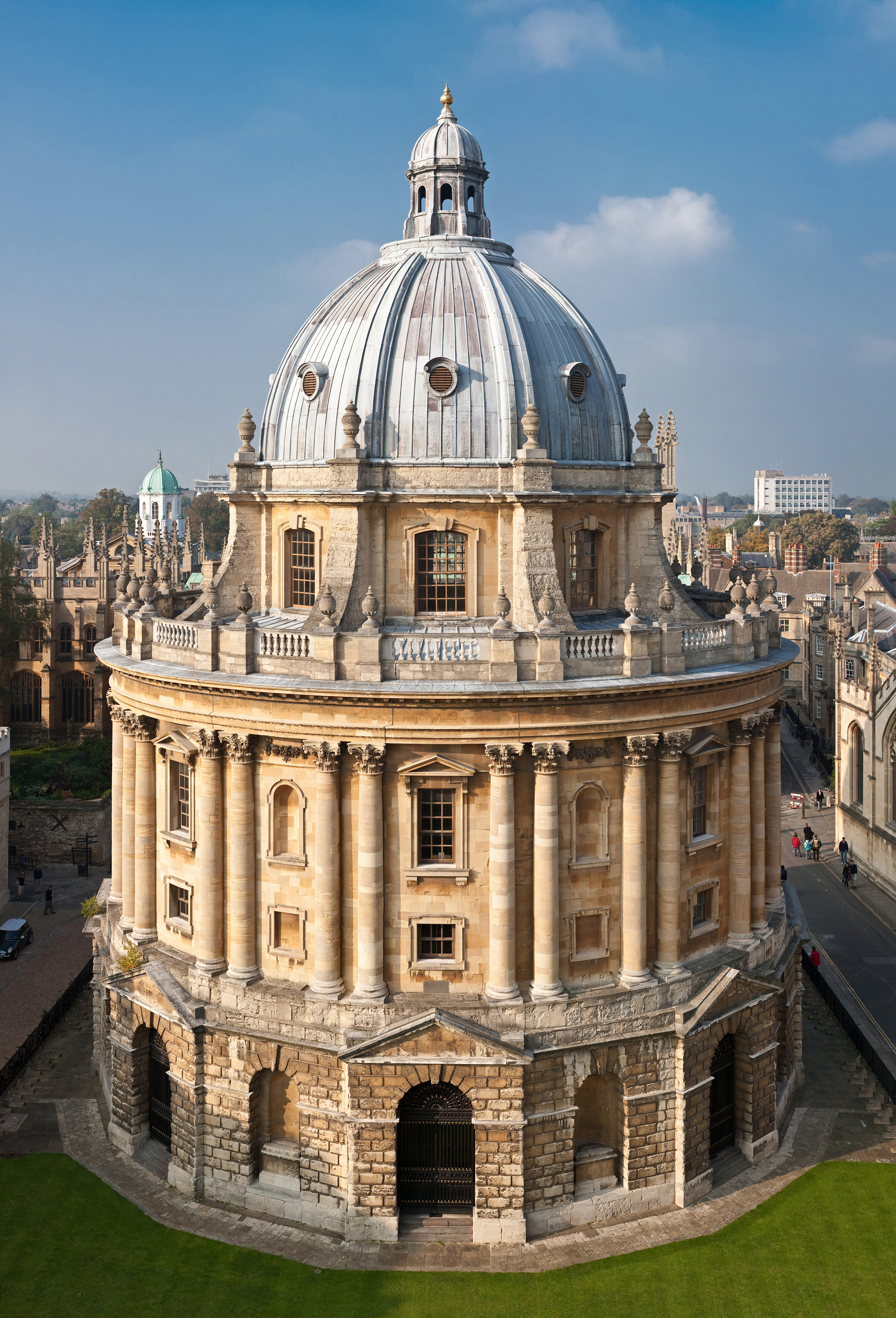
The Radcliffe Camera, viewed from the University Church

=== Later 17th and 18th centuries ===
The agreement with the Stationers' Company meant that the growth of stock was constant and there were also a number of large bequests and acquisitions for other reasons. Until the establishment of the British Museum in 1753, the Bodleian was effectively the national library of England. By then the Bodleian, Cambridge University Library and the Royal Library were the most extensive book collections in England and Wales.

The astronomer Thomas Hornsby observed the transit of Venus from the Tower of the Five Orders in 1769.

The library was significantly supplied by the Strasbourg company Treuttel & Würtz. A large collection of medieval Italian manuscripts was bought from Matteo Luigi Canonici in 1817. In 1829, the library bought the collection of Rabbi David Oppenheim, adding to its Hebrew collection.

=== Radcliffe Camera ===
By the late 19th century, further growth of the library demanded more expansion space. In 1860, the library was allowed to take over the adjacent building, the Radcliffe Camera. In 1861, the library's medical and scientific collections were transferred to the Radcliffe Science Library, which had been built farther north next to the University Museum.

=== Clarendon Building ===
The Clarendon Building was designed by Nicholas Hawksmoor and built between 1711 and 1715, originally to house the printing presses of the Oxford University Press. It was vacated by the Press in the early 19th century, and used by the university for administrative purposes. In 1975, it was handed over to the Bodleian Library, and now provides office and meeting space for senior members of staff.

=== 20th century and after ===
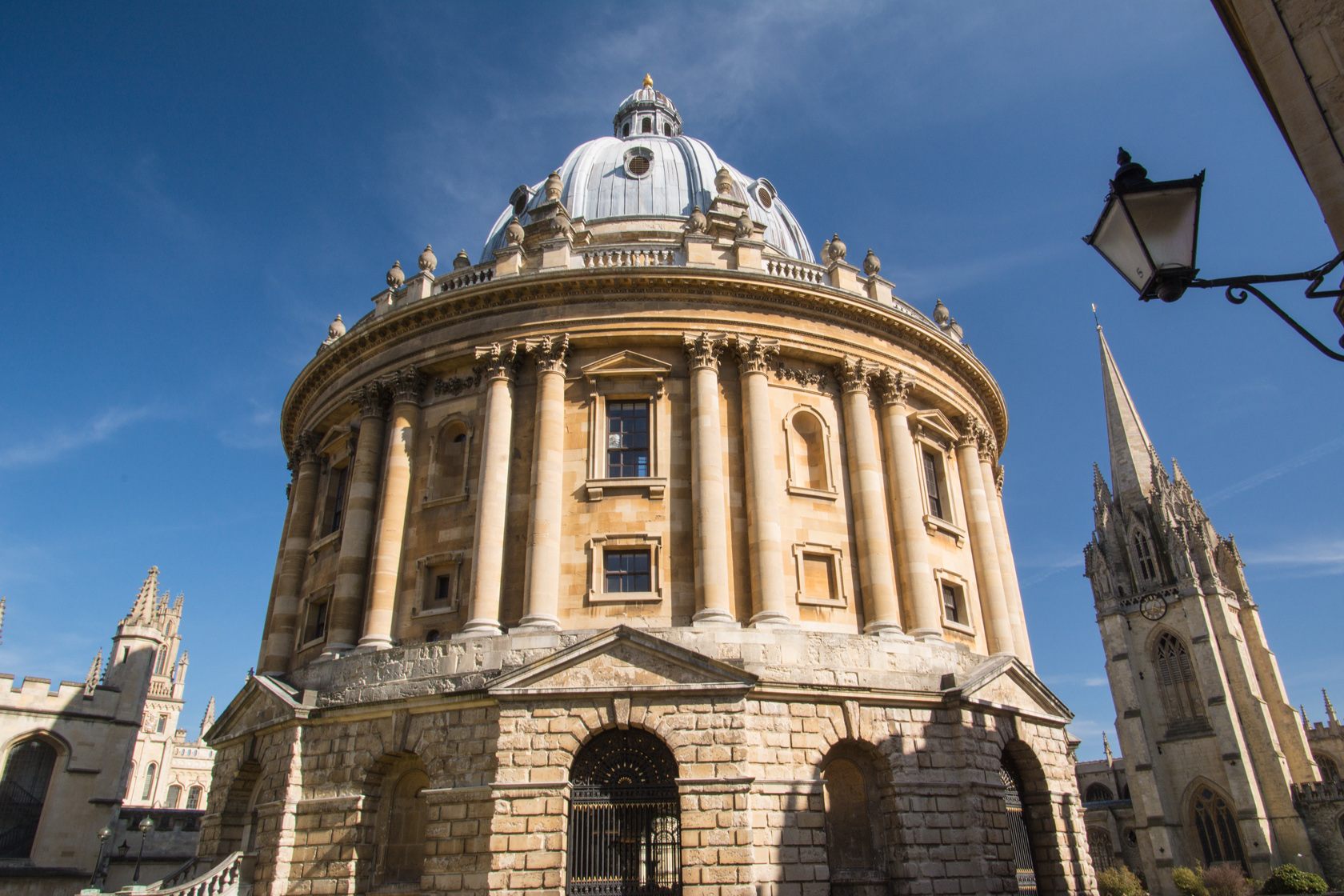
The Radcliffe Camera and the University Church of St Mary the Virgin in 2016

In 1907, the head librarian, Nicholson, had begun a project to revise the catalogue of printed books. In 1909, the prime minister of Nepal, Chandra Shum Shere, donated a large collection of Sanskrit literature to the library.

In 1911, the Copyright Act (now superseded by the Legal Deposit Libraries Act 2003) continued the Stationers' agreement by making the Bodleian one of the six (at that time) libraries covering legal deposit in the United Kingdom where a copy of each published book must be deposited.

Between 1909 and 1912, an underground bookstack was constructed beneath the Radcliffe Camera and Radcliffe Square, known since 2011 as the Gladstone Link. In 1914, the total number of books in the library's collections exceeded 1 million. By 1915, only one quarter of the revised catalogue had been completed, a task made more difficult by library staff going into the war effort, either serving in the armed forces or volunteering to serve in the hospitals. In July 1915, the most valuable books had been moved into a secret location due to a fear that Oxford would be bombed, and a volunteer fire brigade was trained and ready, but Oxford escaped the First World War without being bombed. By the 1920s, the Library needed further expansion space, and in 1937 building work began on the New Bodleian building, opposite the Clarendon Building on the northeast corner of Broad Street.

The New Bodleian was designed by architect Sir Giles Gilbert Scott. Construction was completed in 1940. The building was of an innovative ziggurat design, with 60% of the bookstack below ground level. A tunnel under Broad Street connects the Old and New Bodleian buildings, and contains a pedestrian walkway, a mechanical book conveyor and a pneumatic Lamson tube system which was used for book orders until an electronic automated stack request system was introduced in 2002. The Lamson tube system continued to be used by readers requesting manuscripts to be delivered to Duke Humfrey's Library until it was turned off in July 2009. In 2010, it was announced that the conveyor, which had been transporting books under Broad Street since the 1940s, would be shut down and dismantled on 20 August 2010. The New Bodleian closed on 29 July 2011 prior to rebuilding.

=== Present and future of the libraries ===
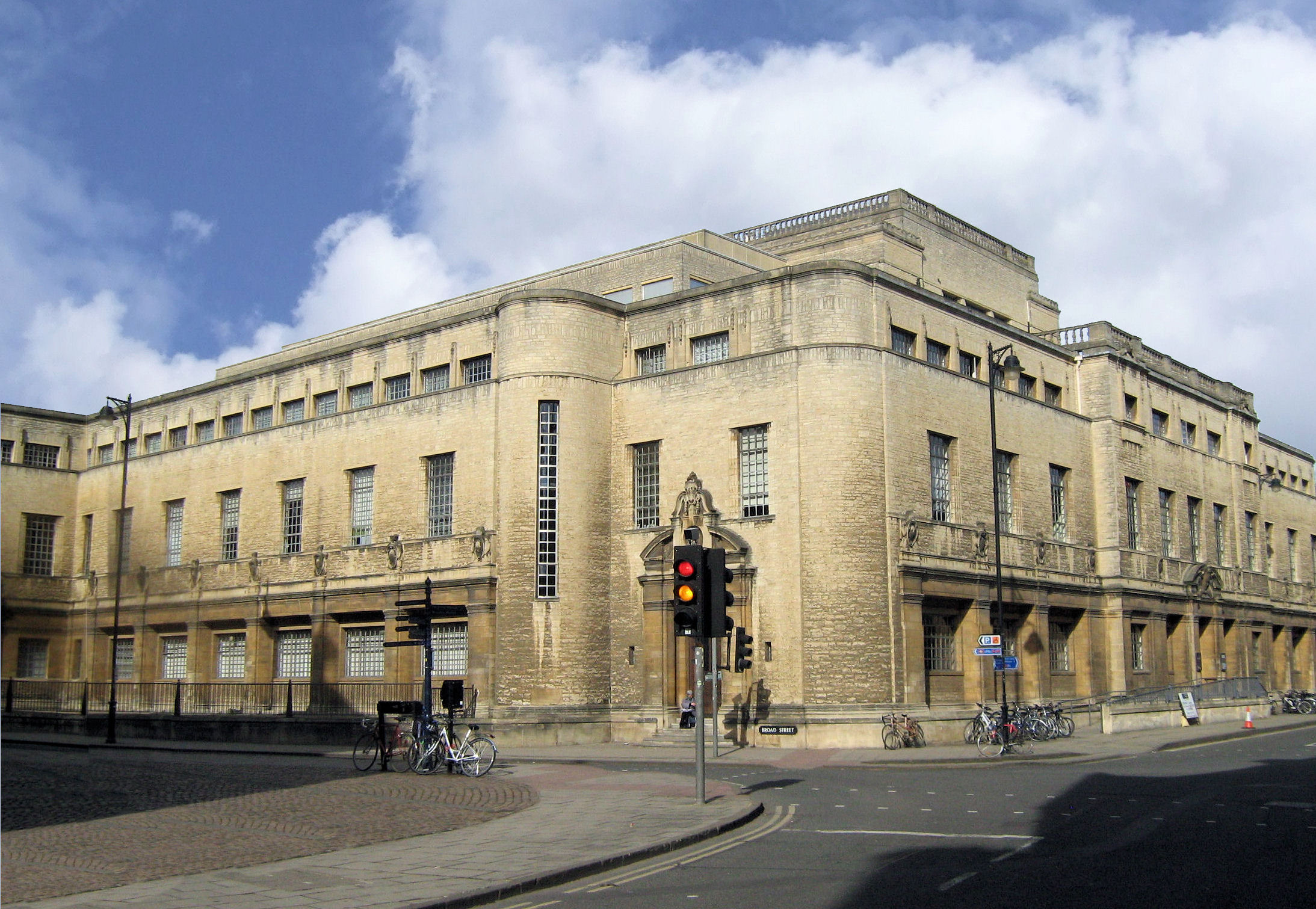
The New Bodleian Library (now the Weston Library)

The New Bodleian building was rebuilt behind its original façade to provide improved storage facilities for rare and fragile material, as well as better facilities for readers and visitors. The new building concept was designed by WilkinsonEyre and the MEP design was undertaken by engineering consultancy Hurley Palmer Flatt. It reopened to readers as the Weston Library on 21 March 2015. In March 2010, the group of libraries known collectively as "Oxford University Library Services" was renamed "The Bodleian Libraries", thus allowing those Oxford members outside the Bodleian to acquire the gloss of the Bodleian brand. The building was nominated for the 2016 Sterling Prize.

In November 2015, its collections topped 12 million items with the acquisition of Shelley's "Poetical Essay on the Existing State of Things". Thought lost from shortly after its publication in 1811 until a copy was rediscovered in a private collection in 2006, the Bodleian has digitized the 20-page pamphlet for online access. The controversial poem and accompanying essay are believed to have contributed to the poet being sent down from Oxford University.

== Copying and preservation of material ==
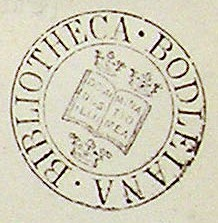
Ex libris stamp of Bodleian Library, circa 1830

The library operates a strict policy on copying of material. Until fairly recently, personal photocopying of library material was not permitted, as there was concern that copying and excessive handling would result in damage. However, individuals may now copy most material produced after 1900, and a staff-mediated service is provided for certain types of material dated between 1801 and 1900. Handheld scanners and digital cameras are also permitted for use on most post-1900 publications and digital cameras may also be used, with permission, with older material. The Library will supply digital scans of most pre-1801 material. Microform copies have been made of many of the most fragile items in the library's collection, and these are substituted for the originals whenever possible. The library publishes digital images of objects in its collection through its Digital Bodleian service.

== Treasures of the library ==
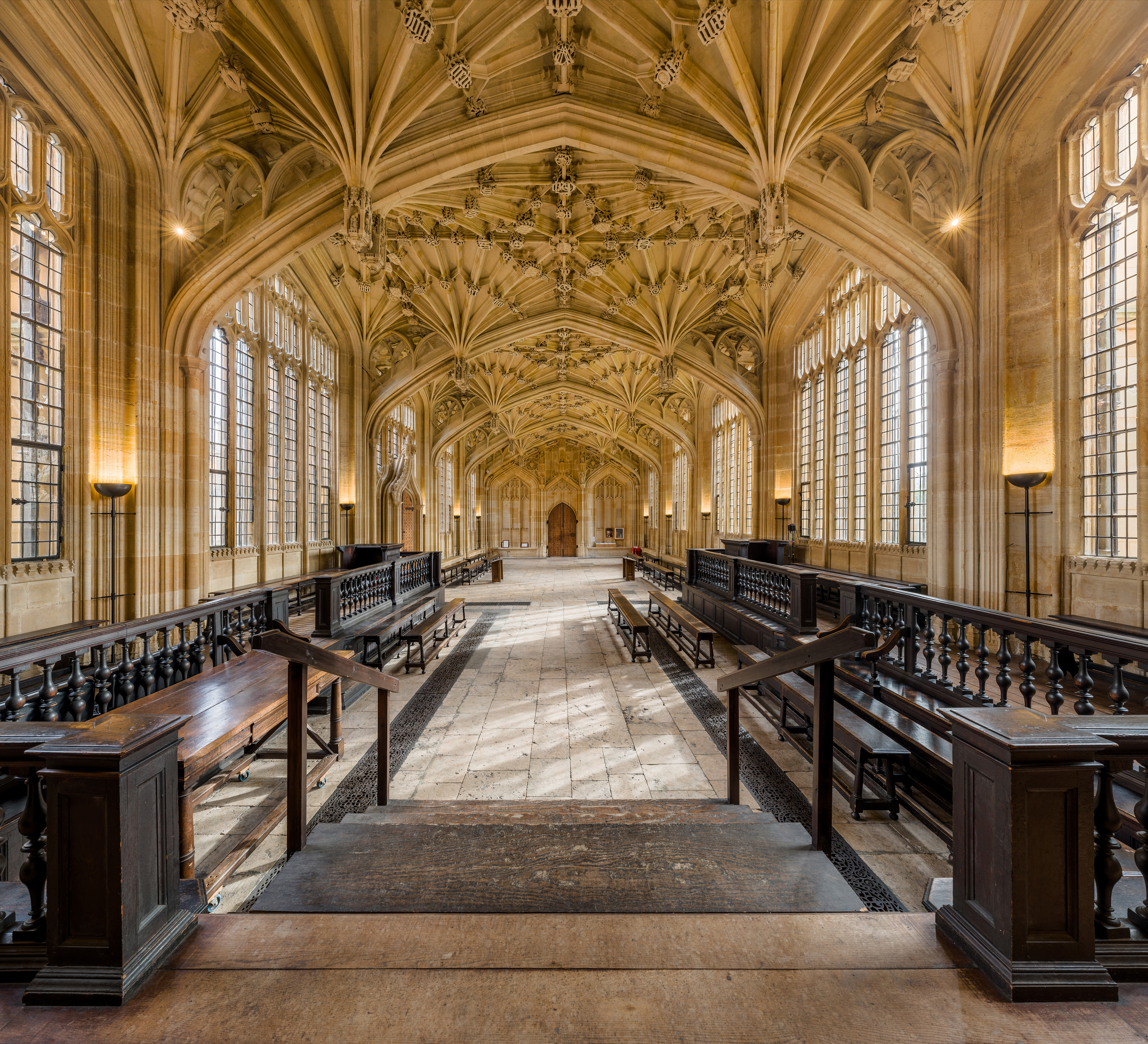
Divinity School interior

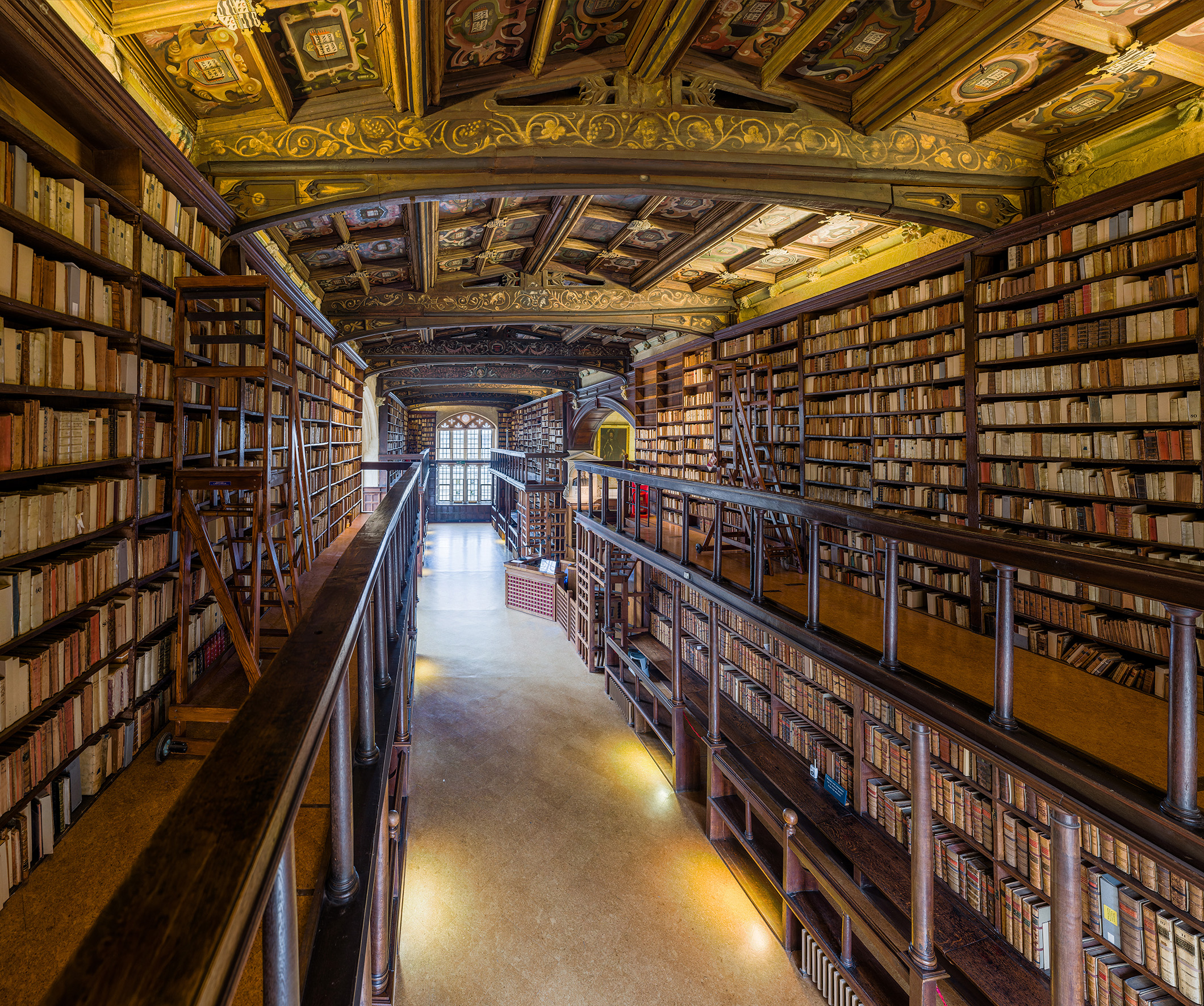
Duke Humfrey's Library interior

=== Manuscript collections ===
- The Armenian Manuscripts (consisting of 140 manuscripts total), with the earliest dating back to the 11th century, donated by Archbishop William Laud (1573–1645)
- The Ashmole Manuscripts (including the Ashmole Bestiary) late 12th or early 13th century, collected by Elias Ashmole
- The Cairo Geniza collection, 6th to 19th centuries CE,
- The Carte Manuscripts, collected by Thomas Carte (1686–1754)
- The Crynes Manuscripts, collected by Nathaniel Crynes (1685/6-1745).
- The Douce Manuscripts, donated to the library by Francis Douce in 1834
- The Laud Manuscripts, donated to the library by Archbishop William Laud between 1635 and 1640
- The letters of the poet Percy Bysshe Shelley
- The Drower Collection (DC), donated by E. S. Drower, is the world's most extensive collection of Mandaean manuscripts.

=== Individual manuscripts ===
- Auf Christi Himmelfahrt allein, BWV 128 cantata by Johann Sebastian Bach
- Abingdon Missal, illuminated manuscript produced at Abingdon Abbey (15th century)
- Ashmole Bestiary, English illuminated manuscript Bestiary with allegorical descriptions of over 100 animals (12th century)
- Bakhshali manuscript, Bower Manuscript and Weber Manuscript of ancient Sanskrit texts (4th–6th centuries)
- Bruce Codex, Coptic manuscript, one of three surviving codices containing full copies of all of the gnostic writings (6th century)
- Bujangga Manik, early palm-leaf manuscript of Old Sundanese literature from Java (15th century)
- Cædmon's Hymn, a short Old English poem attributed to Cædmon (11th century)
- Codex Bodley, important and rare precolumbian pictographic manuscript and example of Mixtec historiography (14th–15th centuries)
- Codex Ebnerianus, Greek language illuminated manuscript of the New Testament (12th century)
- Codex Laudianus, Greek uncial manuscript of the New Testament (6th century)
- Codex Laud, pictorial manuscript consisting of 24 leaves from Central Mexico (16th century)
- Codex Mendoza, Aztec codex containing a history of both the Aztec rulers and their conquest (16th century)
- Codex Selden precolumbian pictorial manuscript of Mixtec origin (16th century)
- Codex Tischendorfianus III, Greek uncial manuscript of the Gospels named after Constantin von Tischendorf (9th–10th centuries)
- Codex Tischendorfianus IV, Greek uncial manuscript of the Gospels (10th century)
- Book of Hours of Engelbert of Nassau illuminated by the Master of Mary of Burgundy for Engelbert II of Nassau, Flanders (15th century)
- The Fairfax MS 16, Middle English poetic anthology (15th century)
- Book of Glendalough, one of the three major surviving Irish manuscripts from pre-Norman Ireland (12th century)
- Hebban olla vogala, long considered to be the only example of Old Dutch in existence (12th century)
- Four fragmented scrolls from the Herculaneum papyri that survived the Eruption of Mount Vesuvius
- The Huntington MS 17, the oldest manuscript with complete text of the four Gospels in Bohairic (Coptic) (12th century)
- Annals of Inisfallen, chronicle of the medieval history of Ireland (11th century)
- Kennicott Bible, one of the most exquisite illuminated manuscripts in the Hebrew language from A Coruña, Spain (15th century)
- Leofric Missal, illuminated manuscript sacramentary from Lotharingia (10th–11th centuries)
- Hours of Louis Quarré, illuminated manuscript attributed to Alexander Bening (15th century)
- Ormesby Psalter, magnificent example of an English illuminated manuscript from Norwich (14th century)
- Peterborough Chronicle, one of the Anglo-Saxon Chronicles, originally held by the monks of Peterborough Abbey in Cambridgeshire (12th century)
- Illuminated Gospel Book of Saint Margaret of Scotland (11th century)
- Selden Roll, Mexican manuscript painted roll from the Coixtlahuaca region (16th century)
- Magna Carta, four of the seventeen extant copies (13th century)
- Oldest copy of the Rule of Saint Benedict (8th century)
- Astronomical manuscript copy of the Book of Fixed Stars (12th century)
- The Song of Roland, single extant manuscript in Old French of the oldest surviving major work of French literature (12th century)
- Rushworth or MacRegol Gospels, Irish illuminated manuscript from Birr, Co Offaly (9th century)
- The Vernon Manuscript, the longest and most important surviving manuscript written in Middle English. (15th century)
- Yongle Encyclopedia, 19 volumes of the second edition of the encyclopedia commissioned by the Yongle Emperor, containing the most important texts available at that time (16th century)

=== Individual printed books ===
- The first book printed in Arabic with moveable type (16th century)
- Bay Psalm Book, One of eleven known surviving first-edition copies of the first book printed in British North America, and the only copy outside the United States (1640)
- Rare copy of The Birds of America by John James Audubon (1827–1838)
- Rare first edition of Don Quixote, the first modern novel (1604)
- A Gutenberg Bible, one of only 21 surviving complete copies (1455)
- Shakespeare's First Folio, collection of plays by William Shakespeare (1623)
- Earliest edition of the popular American song "Yankee Doodle" (after 1775)

=== Other ===
- Agincourt Carol, manuscript of English folk song recounting the Battle of Agincourt (15th century)
- The Gough Map, late-medieval map of the island of Great Britain (14th century)
- Selden Carol Book, medieval manuscript of English carols (15th century)
- Manuscripts of famous authors including Jane Austen, Kenneth Grahame (including the original writing for Wind in the Willows), Franz Kafka, C. S. Lewis, John le Carré, Mary Shelley (including the famous novel Frankenstein), Percy Shelley, and J. R. R. Tolkien
- Archive of the German composer Felix Mendelssohn with many of his letters, drawings and music manuscripts, including the Hebrides overture
- Autograph scores of famous composers including Beethoven (Eccosais and Trio in D for military band), Chopin (Ballade 4), Mozart (Allegro in G Minor for Piano) and Schubert (Sonata in C major for piano four-hands, D 812)
- Shikshapatri, religious text written in Sanskrit by Swaminarayan (19th century)

== Bodley's Librarians ==
The head of the Bodleian Library is known as "Bodley's Librarian". The first librarian, Thomas James, was selected by Bodley in 1599, and the university confirmed James in his post in 1602. Bodley wanted his librarian to be "some one that is noted and known for a diligent Student, and in all his conversation to be trusty, active, and discreet, a graduate also and a Linguist, not encumbered with marriage, nor with a benefice of Cure", although James was able to persuade Bodley to let him get married and to become Rector of St Aldate's Church, Oxford. James said of the Bodleian's collections, "The like Librarie is no where to be found."

In all, 25 have served as Bodley's Librarian; their levels of diligence have varied over the years. Thomas Lockey (1660–1665) was regarded as not fit for the post, John Hudson (1701–1719) has been described as "negligent if not incapable", and John Price (1768–1813) was accused by a contemporary scholar of "a regular and constant neglect of his duty".

Sarah Thomas, who served from 2007 to 2013, was the first woman to hold the position, and the second librarian (after her predecessor, Reginald Carr) also to be director of Oxford University Library Services (now Bodleian Libraries). Thomas, an American, was also the first foreign librarian to run the Bodleian. Her successor from January 2014 is Richard Ovenden, who was deputy librarian under Thomas.

== In popular culture ==
=== Novels ===
The Bodleian is one of the libraries consulted by Christine Greenaway (one of Bodley's librarians) in Colin Dexter's Inspector Morse novel The Wench Is Dead (1989). The denouement of Michael Innes's Operation Pax (1951) is set in an imaginary version of the underground bookstack, reached at night by sliding down the "Mendip cleft", a chute concealed in Radcliffe Square.

Since J. R. R. Tolkien had studied philology at Oxford and eventually became a professor, many of Tolkien's manuscripts are now at the library.

Historian and novelist Deborah Harkness, set much of the early part of her 2011 novel, A Discovery of Witches, in the Bodleian, particularly the Selden End. The novel also features one of the library's Ashmole manuscripts (Ashmole 782) as a central element of the book.

Medieval historian Dominic Selwood set part of his 2013 crypto-thriller The Sword of Moses in Duke Humfrey's Library, and the novel hinges on the library's copy of a magical medieval Hebrew manuscript known as "The Sword of Moses".

=== Location filming ===
The Library's architecture has made it a popular location for filmmakers, representing either Oxford University or other locations. It can be seen in the opening scene of The Golden Compass (2007), Brideshead Revisited (1981 TV serial), Wonka (2023), Another Country (1984), The Madness of King George III (1994), and the first two, as well as the fourth, Harry Potter films, in which the Divinity School doubles as the Hogwarts hospital wing and the room in which Professor McGonagall teaches the students to dance, as well as Duke Humfrey's Library as the Hogwarts library.

== See also ==
- Books in the United Kingdom
- Codex Baroccianus
- Convocation House
- Digby Mythographer
- European Library
- Google Books
- Michael Shen Fu-Tsung
