= Radcliffe Square =

Square in central Oxford, England

Coordinates: 51.753357°N 1.253988°W

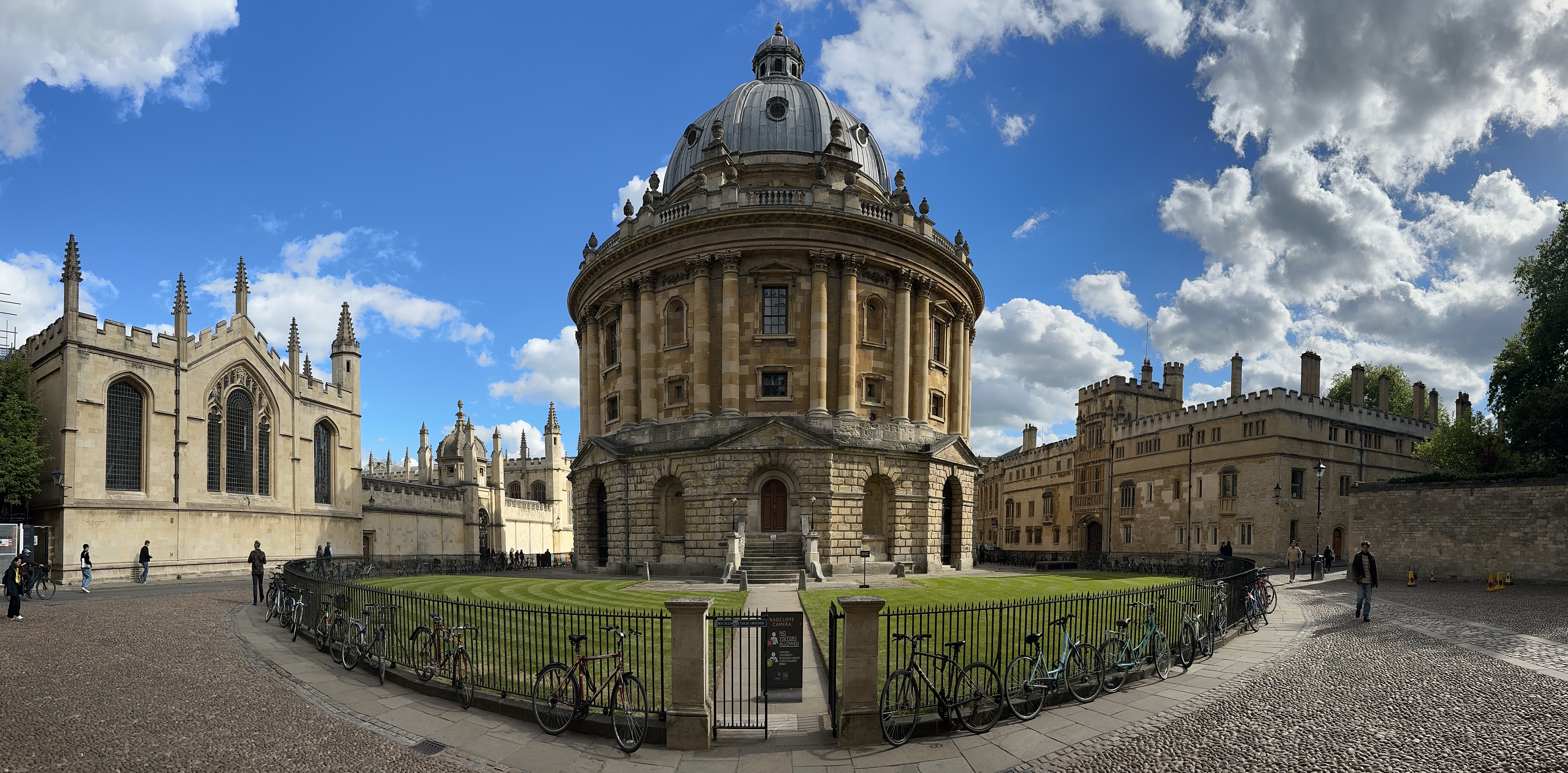
The Radcliffe Camera is the centrepiece of Radcliffe Square. All Souls College is on the left and Brasenose College is on the right.

Radcliffe Square is a square in central Oxford, England. It is surrounded by historic Oxford University and college buildings. The square is cobbled, laid to grass surrounded by railings in the centre, and is pedestrianised except for access.

The square is named after John Radcliffe, a student of the university who became doctor to the King, made a large fortune, and left a significant legacy to the University and his college (University College), which is nearby in the High Street to the south.

The centrepiece of the square is the circular and imposing Radcliffe Camera, a library (originally for science) paid for by John Radcliffe's legacy, built 1737–48. This is part of the Bodleian Library, the main building of which is situated immediately to the north of the square. The two are connected by a tunnel and there are many books stored under the square (with space for around 600,000 volumes). These books may be requested by readers. There used to be a small underground railway to transport books between the Radcliffe Camera and the main Bodleian site. To the west is Brasenose College, one of Oxford's older colleges. To the east is All Souls College, which only has fellows and no students, and is thus largely dedicated to research. A good view can be had through the gate leading to the square, since although these are normally locked, they consist of metal railings. The eastern side of the square forms part of Catte Street.

At the southern side of the square is the University Church of St Mary the Virgin, with its tall spire. This is the official church of Oxford University and is where the Oxford Martyrs were tried for heresy. A good view of Radcliffe Square and the rest of central Oxford is available from the tower, which is open to the public for a charge.

The square is widely regarded as the most beautiful in Oxford, and is very popular with tourists. There are no modern buildings to be seen, so it is also used as a setting for period films (e.g., Young Sherlock Holmes, in which Brasenose featured as Sherlock Holmes' college).

The square was also part of the venue for the Brasenose Quincentenary Ball in 2009 which celebrated 500 years of the college.

In 2024 Radcliffe Square became the site of a second Palestinian solidarity encampment during the 2024 University of Oxford pro-Palestinian campus occupations.

== Gallery ==
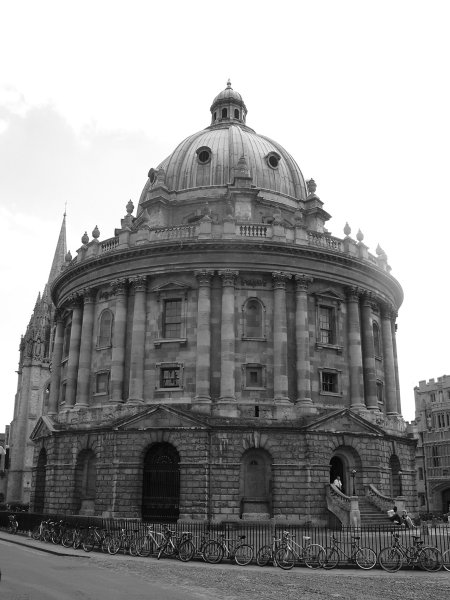
The Radcliffe Camera in Radcliffe Square, with the spire of St Mary's, the University church, behind.

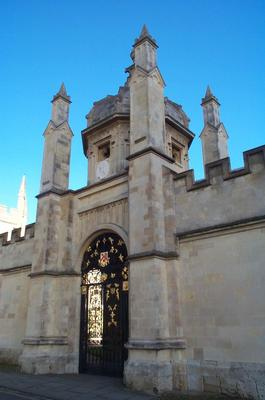
The ornamental railinged gate of All Souls College on Radcliffe Square.

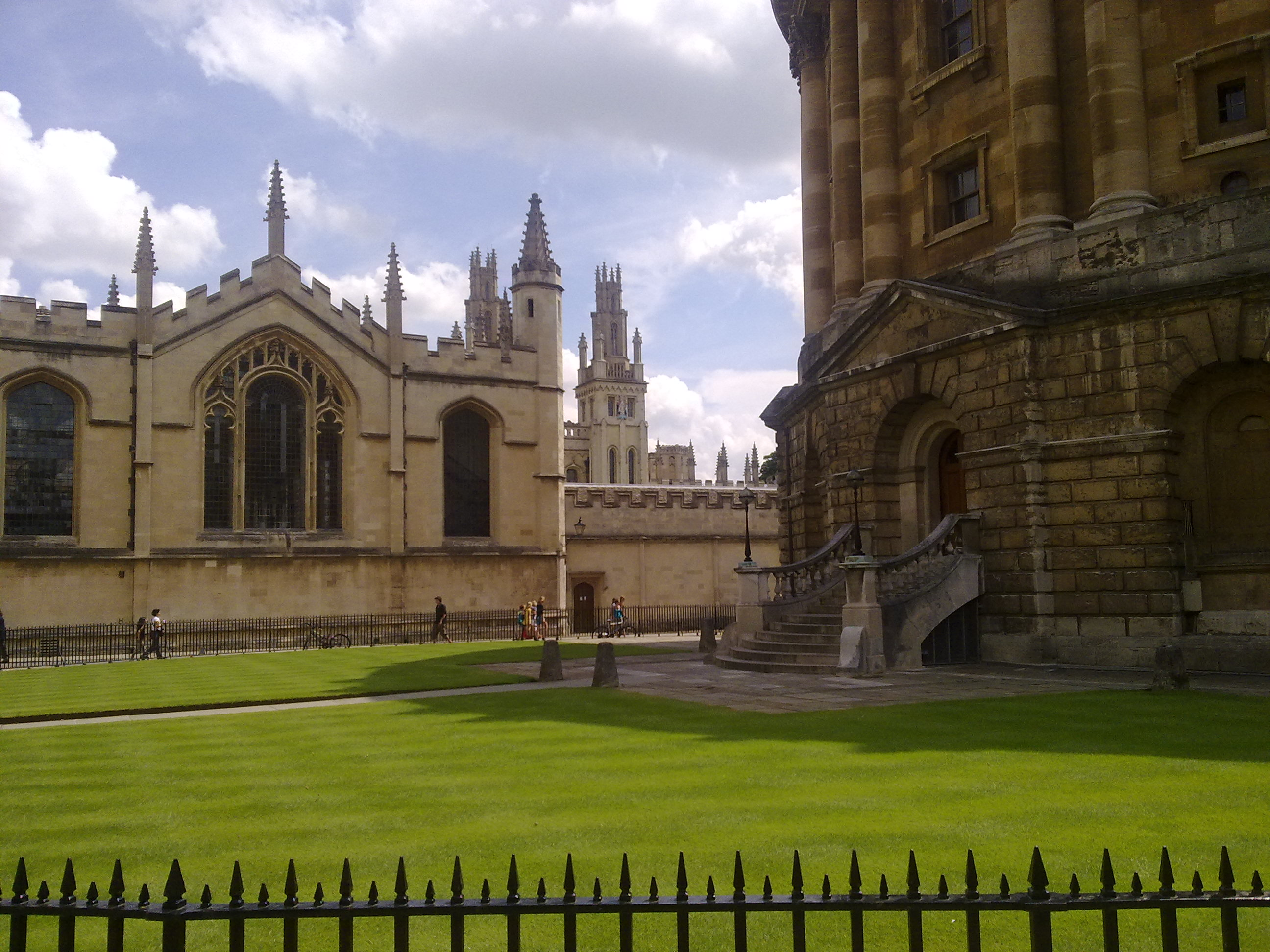
The mid eastern side of Radcliffe Square, towards All Souls College.

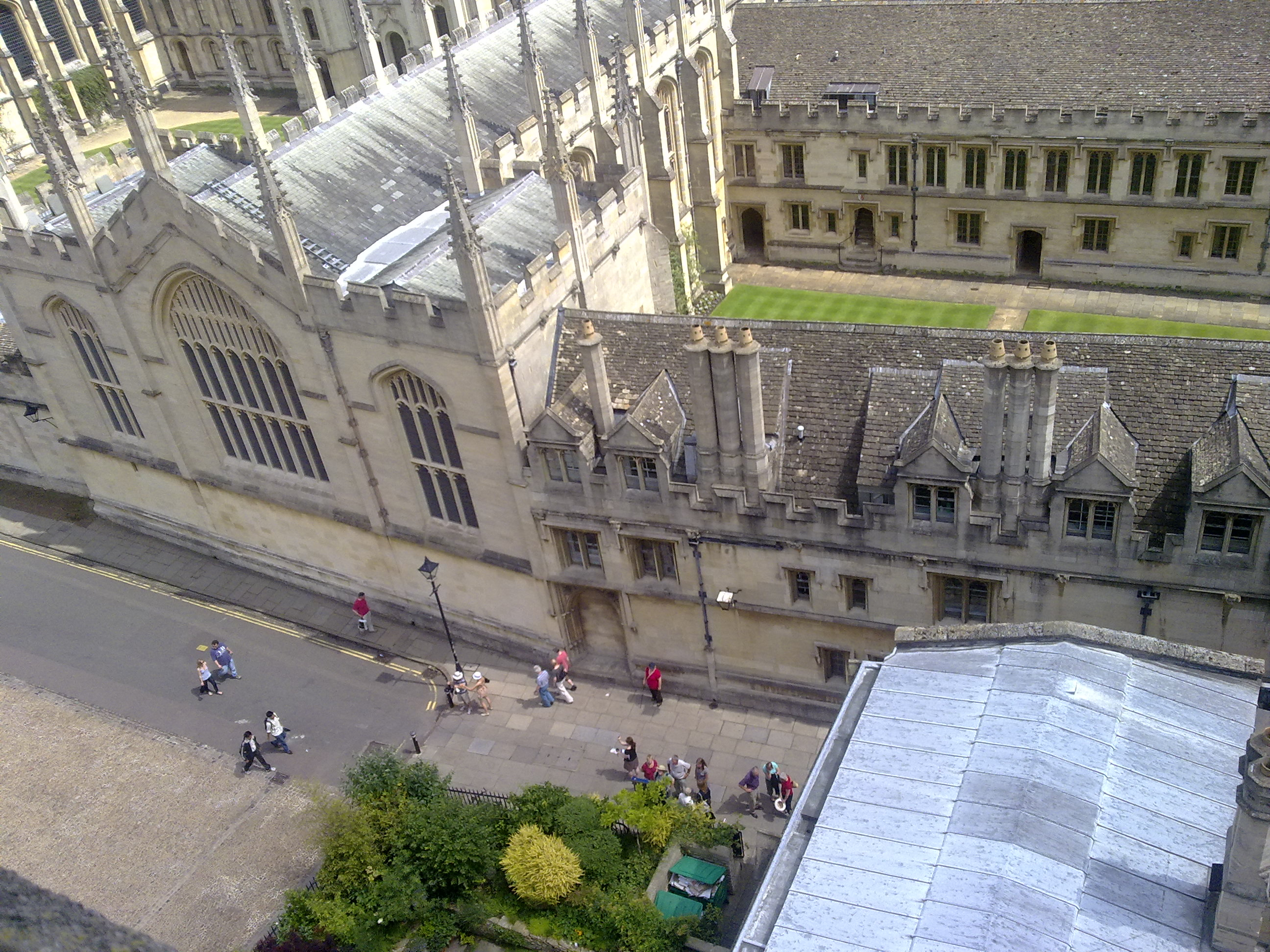
The south east corner of Radcliffe Square, as viewed from St Mary's, with All Souls College at the top of the picture.

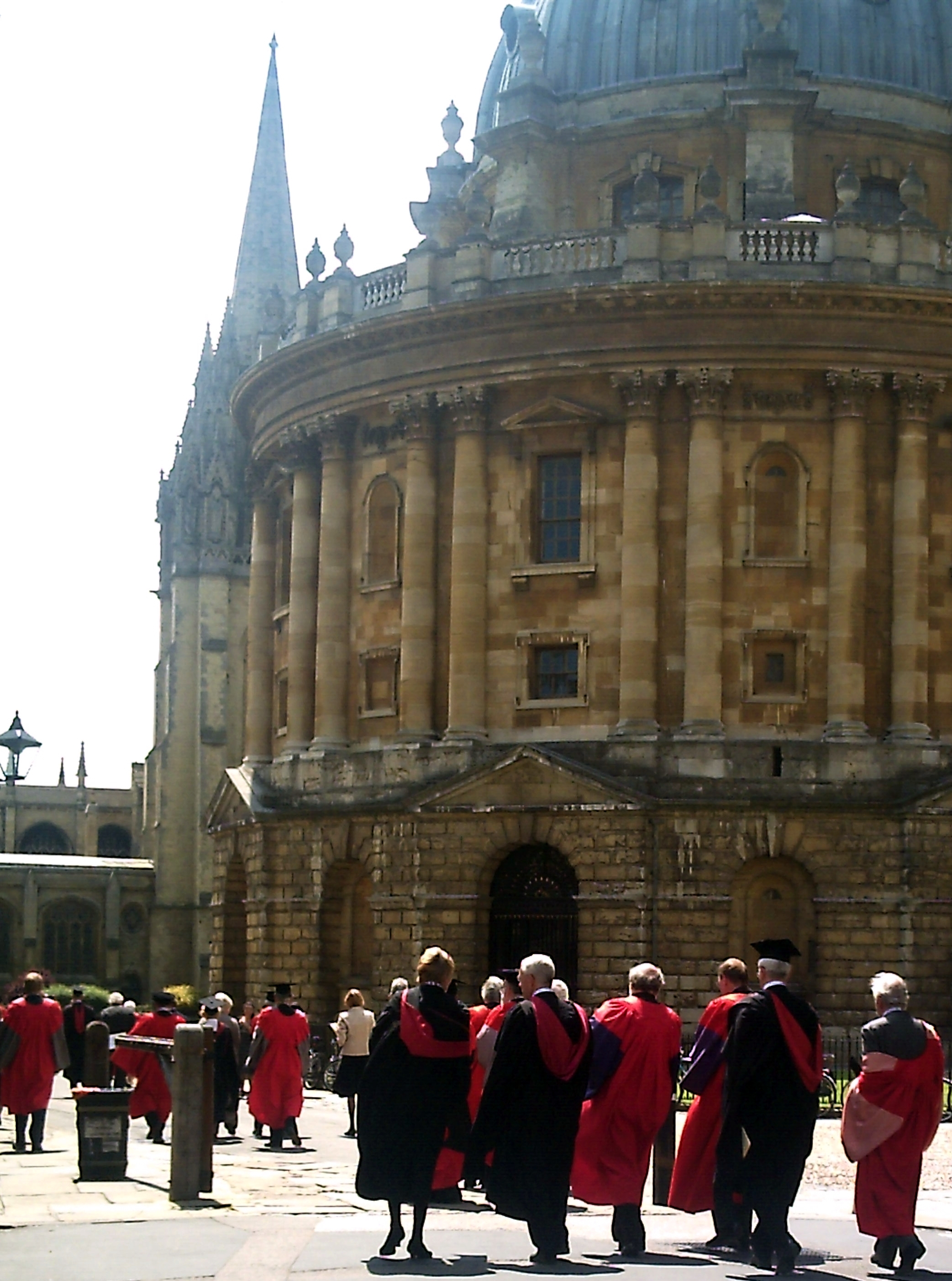
Radcliffe Square on the day of Encaenia, 2009.

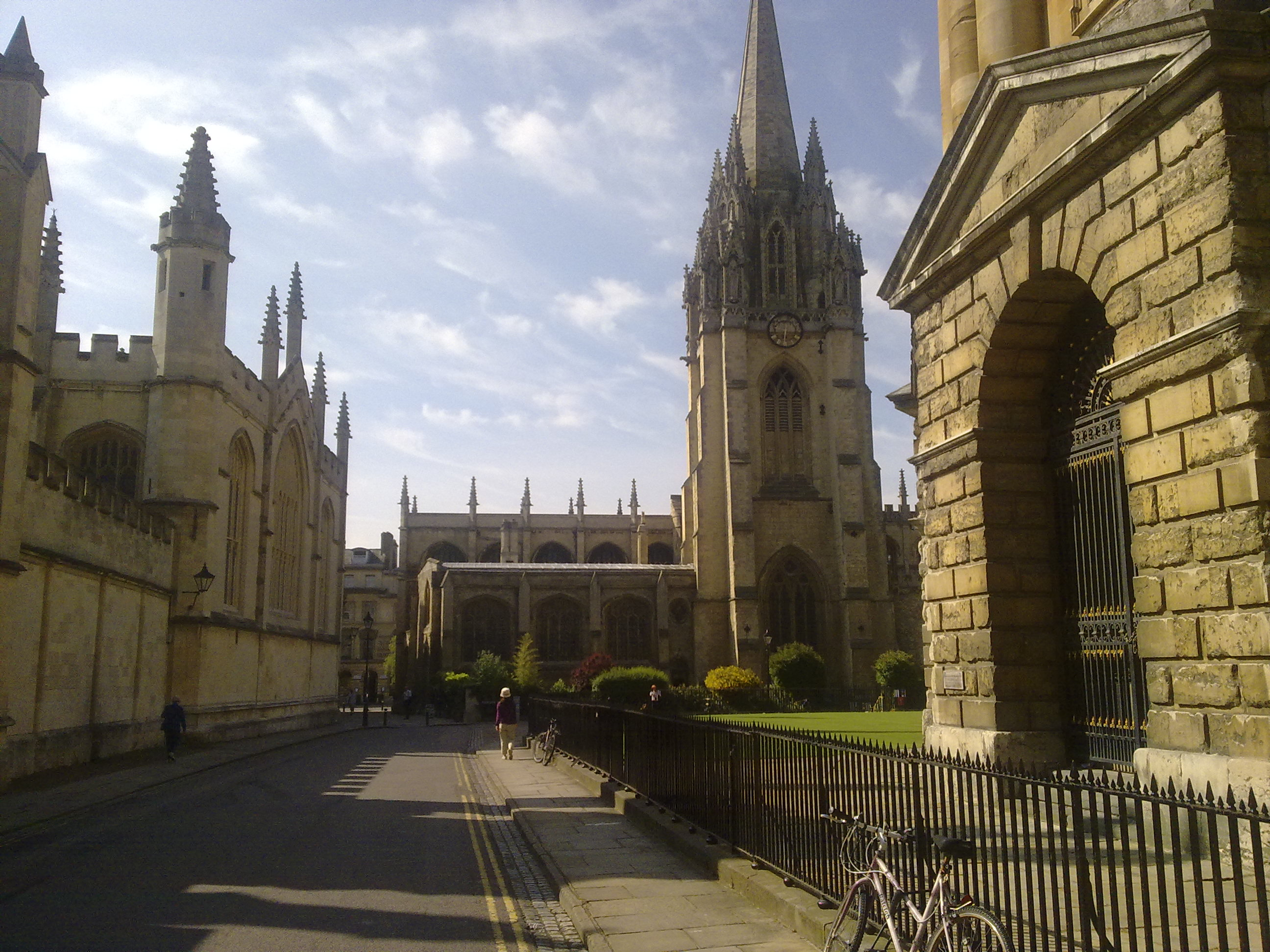
The south east corner of Radcliffe Square, looking along Catte Street towards St Mary's

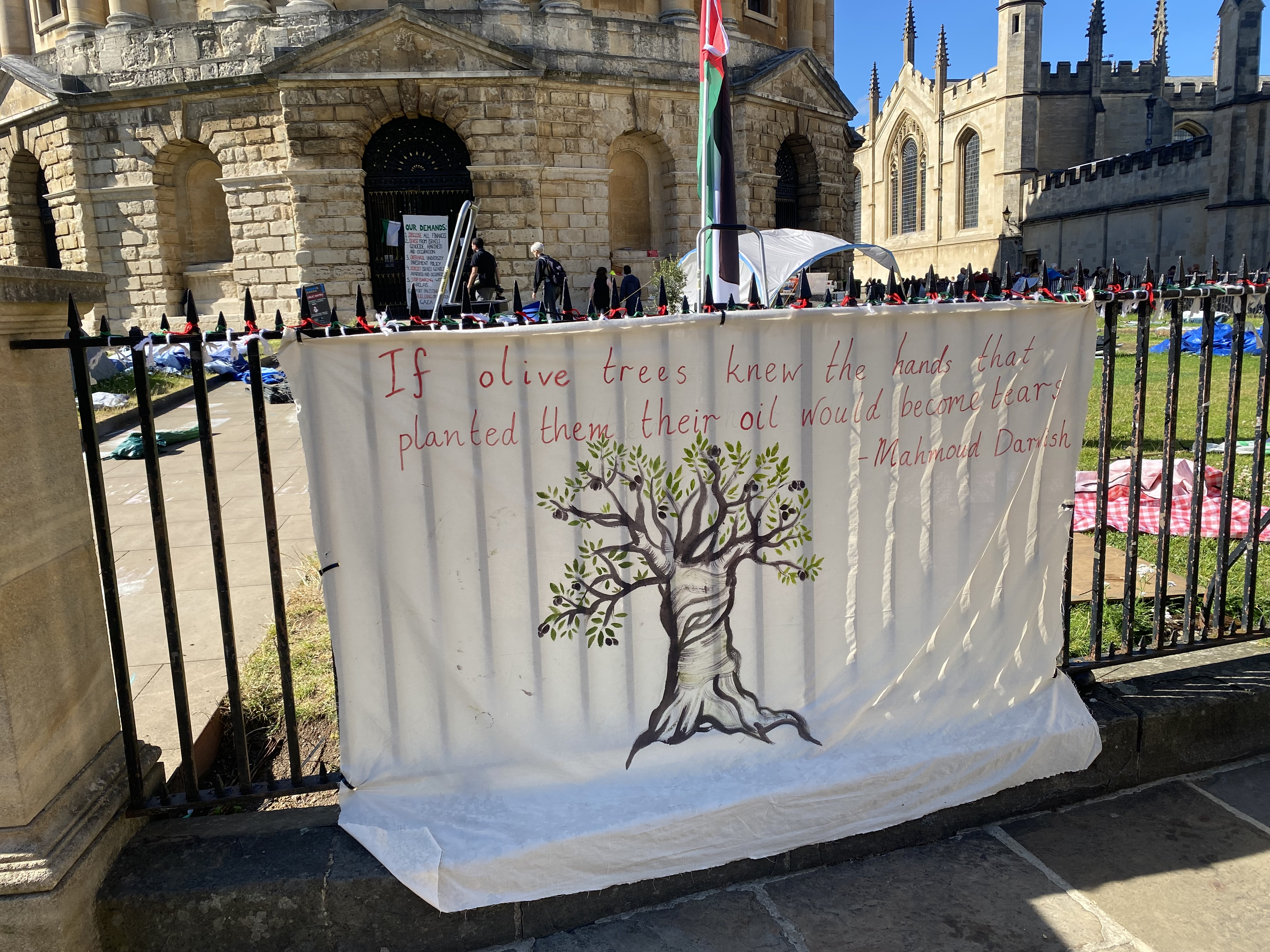
Palestinian solidarity encampment erected in Radcliffe Square, 2024
