= Drexel 4257 =

17th-century British music manuscript commonplace book

- New York Public Library for the Performing Arts
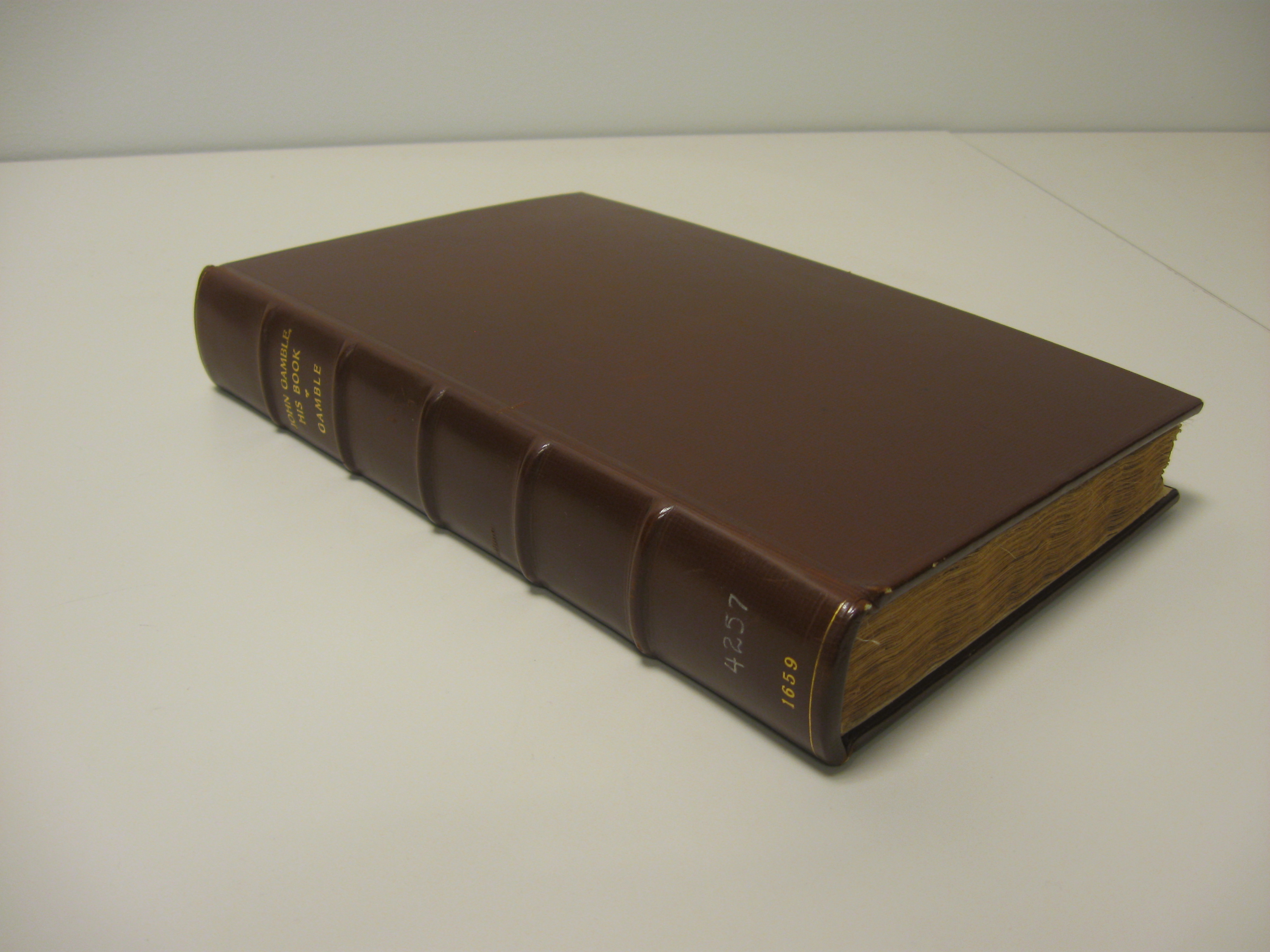
- Also known as: John Gamble his booke
- Type: Commonplace book
- Date: 1659 or 1660
- Place of origin: England
- Language: English
- Size: 227 leaves

Drexel 4257, also known by an inscription on its first page, "John Gamble, his booke, amen 1659" is a music manuscript commonplace book. It is the largest collection of English songs from the first half to the middle of the 17th century, and is an important source for studying vocal music in its transition from Renaissance music to Baroque music in England. Many songs also provide commentary on contemporary political events leading up to the Restoration.

Belonging to the New York Public Library, it forms part of the Music Division's Drexel Collection, located at the New York Public Library for the Performing Arts. Following traditional library practice, its name is derived from its call number.

The compilation of the text may have started as early as the turn of the 17th century, but the manuscript had been completed in 1659 or 1660. Some of the songs in the manuscript contain references to the then-new king Charles II of England, who assumed the throne in 1660. The watermark of the manuscript is a fleur-de-lis. The same watermark was used in at least two other English books of the 1650s, suggesting a common origin.

John Gamble is thought to have acquired an unfinished version of the manuscript in 1642 or 1643, when the musicians of the Royal Chapel were dispersed as a result of the English Civil War. He apparently made his own handwritten additions over the following years, and likely kept the manuscript in his book collection until his death in 1687. The manuscript was forgotten until 1846, when it resurfaced as part of the collection of the musicologist Edward Francis Rimbault.

== Historical context ==
Before researchers took active interest in it, the field of 17th-century British song had not been investigated. Music historian Charles Burney had a negative opinion towards British vocal music in this period. That attitude was carried through the beginning of the 20th century, where in the first edition of the Oxford History of Music, Hubert Parry stated that English composers' sense of musical line was deficient.

Vincent Duckles thought one reason for the negative attitude might have been the lack of published sources: Between 1627 (the publication date of John Hilton's Ayres or Fa-las) and 1651 (John Playford's Musical Banquet), there appeared only a single publication of British vocal music: Walter Porter's Madrigales and Ayres of 1632.

Scholarly work on Drexel 4257 was one of the major reasons for a change in attitude. With over 320 songs, 250 of which contain music, it is "the largest single body of early 17th-century English songs that we know." "The composers ... all belonged to the small world of court musicians that suffered disruption during the English Civil War and the Commonwealth of England. Some began their careers late in the reign of James I, most saw service in court of Charles I, and a few survived to return to their posts at the invitation of Charles II." For the most part, their active careers were over by 1660 or shortly thereafter.

The compiler (or compilers) was not an antiquarian: this collection of songs was intended for practical use, and represents the generation of English composers active between 1630 and 1660. As such, Drexel 4257 "stands as the record of English musical and literary taste as it developed over a period of some thirty years," moving from the late Jacobean era to Restoration periods. Though its musical contents may sometimes be variable, its main interest is that, as a document of its time, it reflects contemporary taste, offering comments on contemporary events and references to the past.

By virtue of its repertoire and of the period covered, Drexel 4257 is closely related to other 17th-century English music manuscripts: 2240 (British Library Deposit), Drexel 4041 (New York Public Library), Don.c.57 (Bodleian Library), Add. 29,396 (British Library), Add. 11,608 (British Library), MS B.1 (Bodleian Library), Add. 31432 (British Library), Add. 10337 (British Library), F.5.13 (Trinity College, Dublin), Egerton 2013 (British Library), Drexel 4175 (New York Public Library), Add 29381 (British Library), MS 1041 (Lambeth Palace Library), and MS 87 (Christ Church Library).

== General and physical description ==
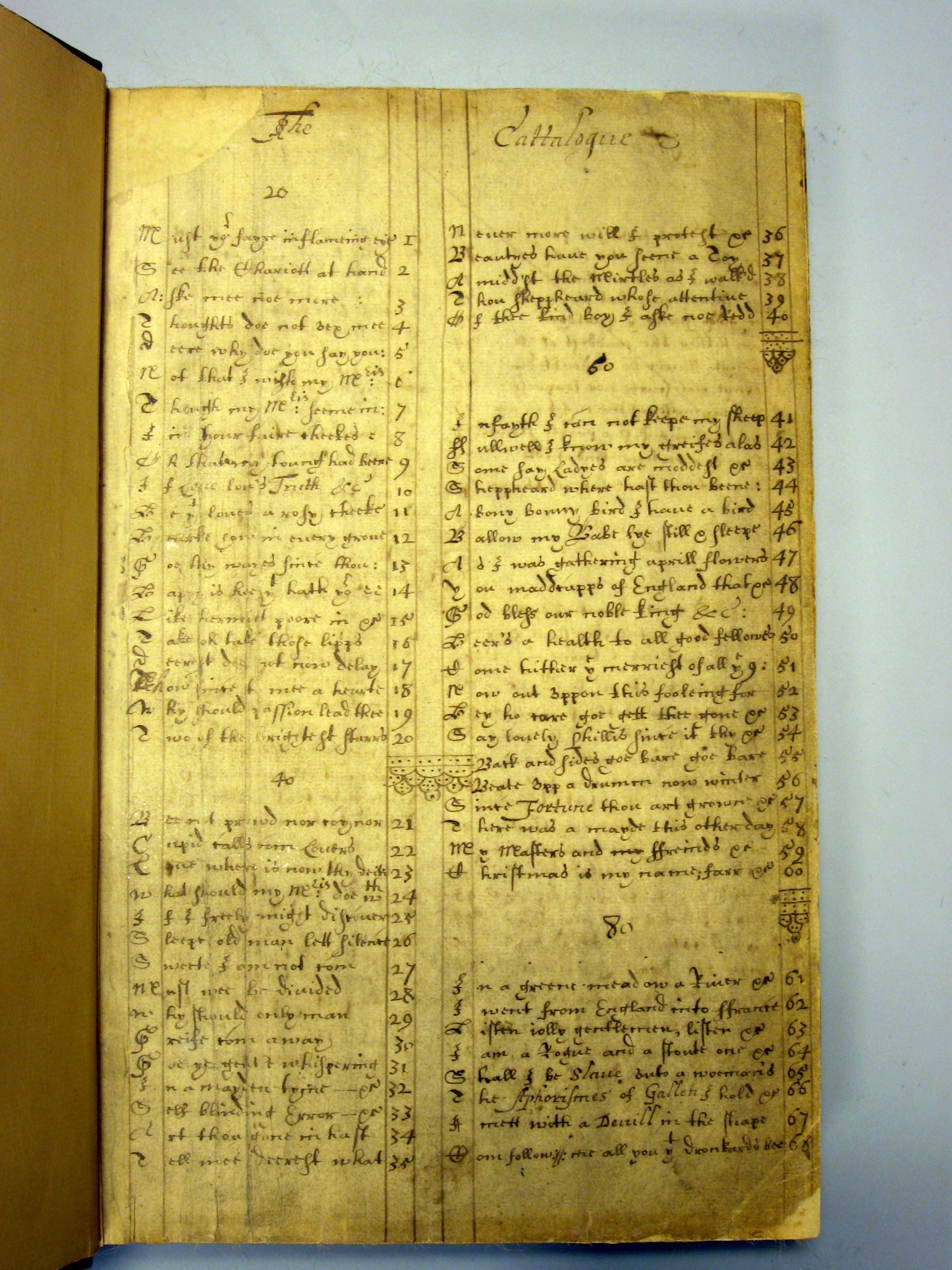
Folio 3 recto, containing the first page of "The Cattalogue"

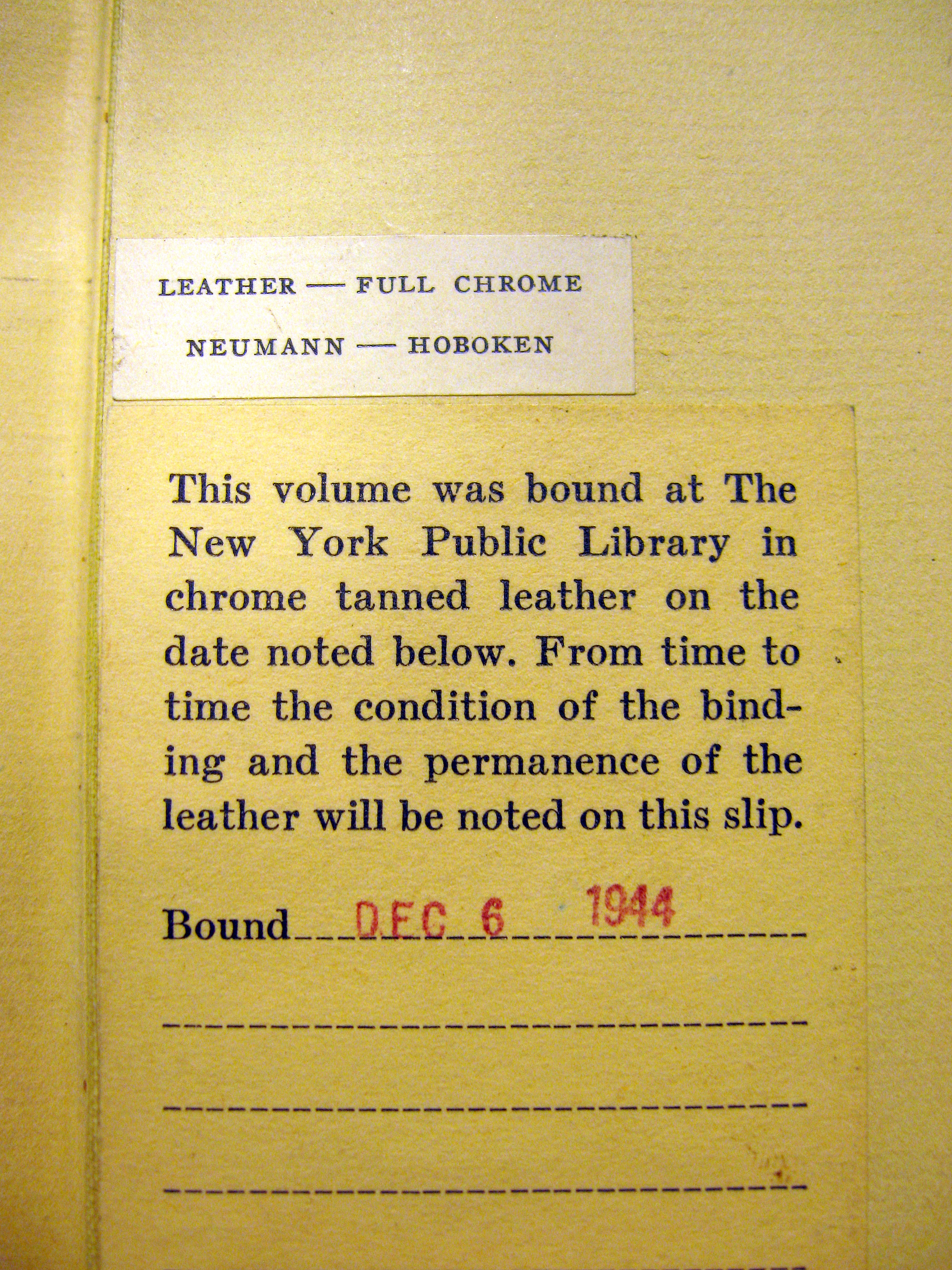
Binding information from the inside back cover of Drexel 4257

The binding of Drexel 4257 measures 30.3 × 20 × 4.7 centimetres (11.9 × 7.9 × 1.9 in). It contains 227 leaves which measure 29.5 × 19 centimetres (11.6 × 7.5 in) (the leaves' varying length can add or subtract several millimeters to their respective measurement). As the image at left indicates, the volume was rebound on December 6, 1944, by Neumann Leathers of Hoboken, New Jersey. The folios are not numbered, but each song is numbered. Using different methods of enumeration, scholars have disagreed on how many songs are contained in the manuscript. Hughes wrote that the collection contained 246 songs, 146 of which are by unidentified composers, but he was only counting songs with "a musical setting sufficiently complete to make identification possible." Duckles claimed there were 325 different songs numbered 1 through 329: two songs occur twice ("Keepe on yor vayle and hide yor Eye" nos. 134 and 237, and "If thou wilt loue me I'le loue thee" nos. 174 and 215). Additionally, nos. 275 ("Stay, stay, prate noe more") and 324 ("I haue reason to Fly thee") are satirical replies to anti-Royalist lyrics not included in the manuscript. No. 206 is blank and not identified in the index, and the song "Why sligh'stt thou her whome I aproue" is both nos. 222 and 223. There are also two songs listed in the index for which no space was allotted. For Duckles, eighty-five of the 325 songs are lacking music and have either just titles, or titles and lyrics only. Elise Bickford Jorgens counted 327 songs, including songs listed in at least one of the two tables of contents but for which there is no music. (This article and the table below uses Jorgens' enumeration.)

The breakdown of the 97 songs by known composers is as follows: John Gamble (28), Henry Lawes (28), William Lawes (10), John Wilson (11), William Webb (8), Thomas Brewer (3), Robert Smith (2), Nicholas Lanier (2), Walter Youckney (2), Robert Johnson (1), John Withy (1), and Charles Coleman (1).

Folio 1 verso contains a bawdy lyric followed by the inscription written twice, "John Gamble his booke amen 1-6-5-9 an[n]o Domini." The material on Folio 2 recto is from a later date. The upper half of the page contains an engraved portrait of Gamble, printed by W. Richardson in 1795, pasted in. The lower portion contains a brief biographical inscription concerning Gamble in the hand of the former owner, Edward F. Rimbault. A note giving a brief description of the contents has been tipped in near the center of the binding.

There are two tables of contents. The first, with the heading "The Cattalogue" on folios 3r-5r, is a numbered list of songs from 1 through 266. Starting with song no. 201, the style of enumeration varies inconsistently: no. 201 is listed as 2001, 220 is listed as 20020. Additionally, there is a group of songs incorrectly altered to 300s. The second table, on folios 5v-8r, has no heading but is an alphabetical grouping of songs where in each letter the songs are listed sequentially. This list was apparently compiled after the manuscript was completed and includes all songs except nos. 314–317. It is written by the same hand as the enumerator of songs 177–266 in "The Cattalogue."

The manuscript as currently bound (the date accompanying the binding information on the inside rear cover is stamped Dec. 6, 1944) has some songs out of sequence (nos. 331–340), surrounded by no. 311 and 312.

== Dating ==
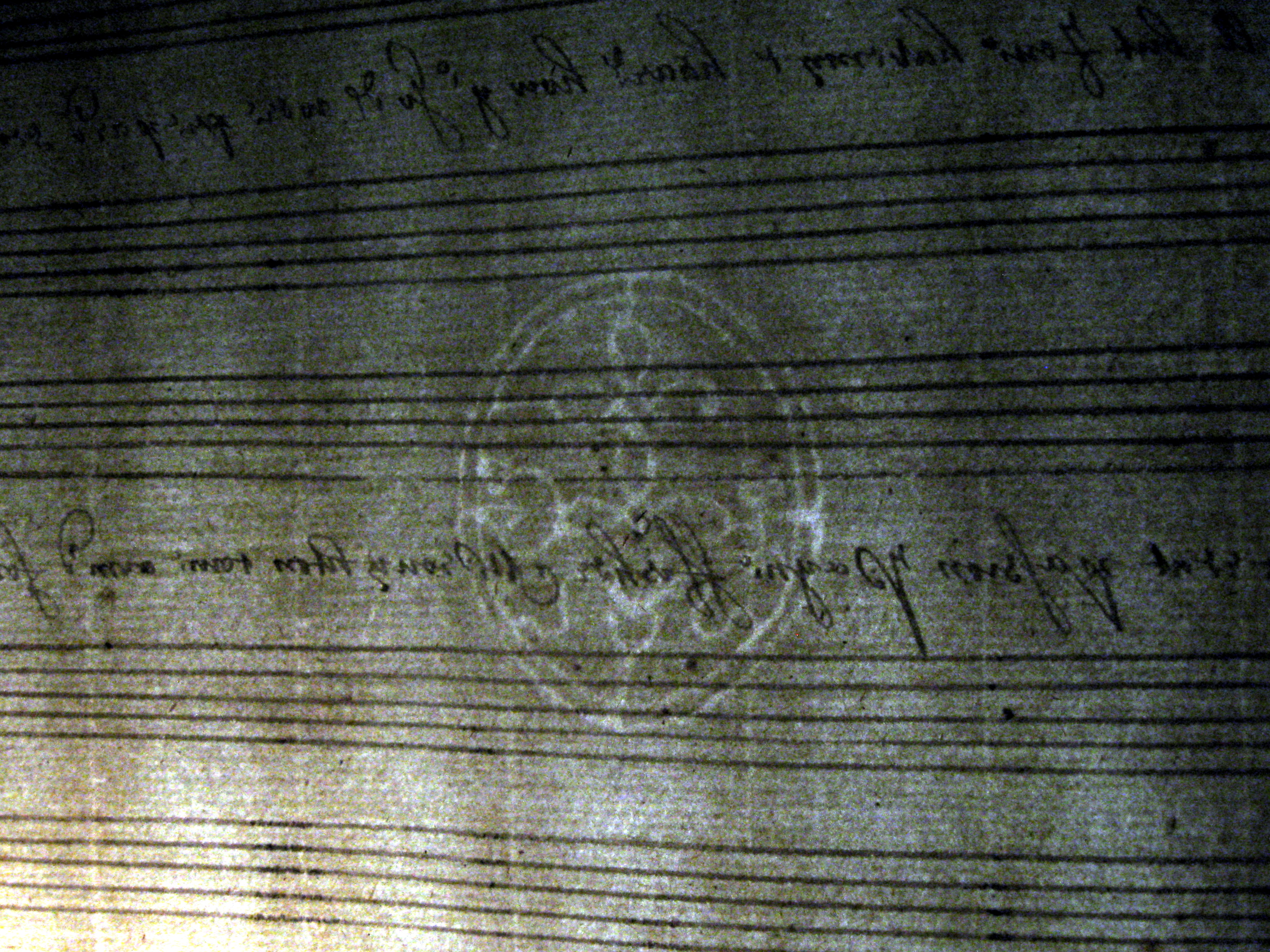
Watermark from Drexel 4257

The date of 1659 (from Gamble's inscription on 1v) has been a source of puzzlement to those who have studied the manuscript. Willa McClung Evans, consulting Edward Heawood's study of watermarks (used to date paper), noted the watermark, a fleur-de-lis, was of undetermined origin, but was also used in Fuller's "Holy State" of 1652, and Denis Petau "History of the World" of 1659. Charles W. Hughes believed the book was begun around the turn of the 17th century - a hypothesis rejected by Jorgens who notes that it contains works by Henry Lawes, born in 1596. Hughes believed the terminal date was at least 1660, as some of the songs refer to Charles II of England, who assumed the throne in the Stuart Restoration of 1660. Duckles noted that the earliest lyrics were from England's Helicon (1600) and Davison's Poetical Rhapsody (1602). Duckles felt that 1659 is close to the terminal date, noting that no songs had been added after the English Commonwealth period, and no younger composers were included in the collection.

== Provenance ==
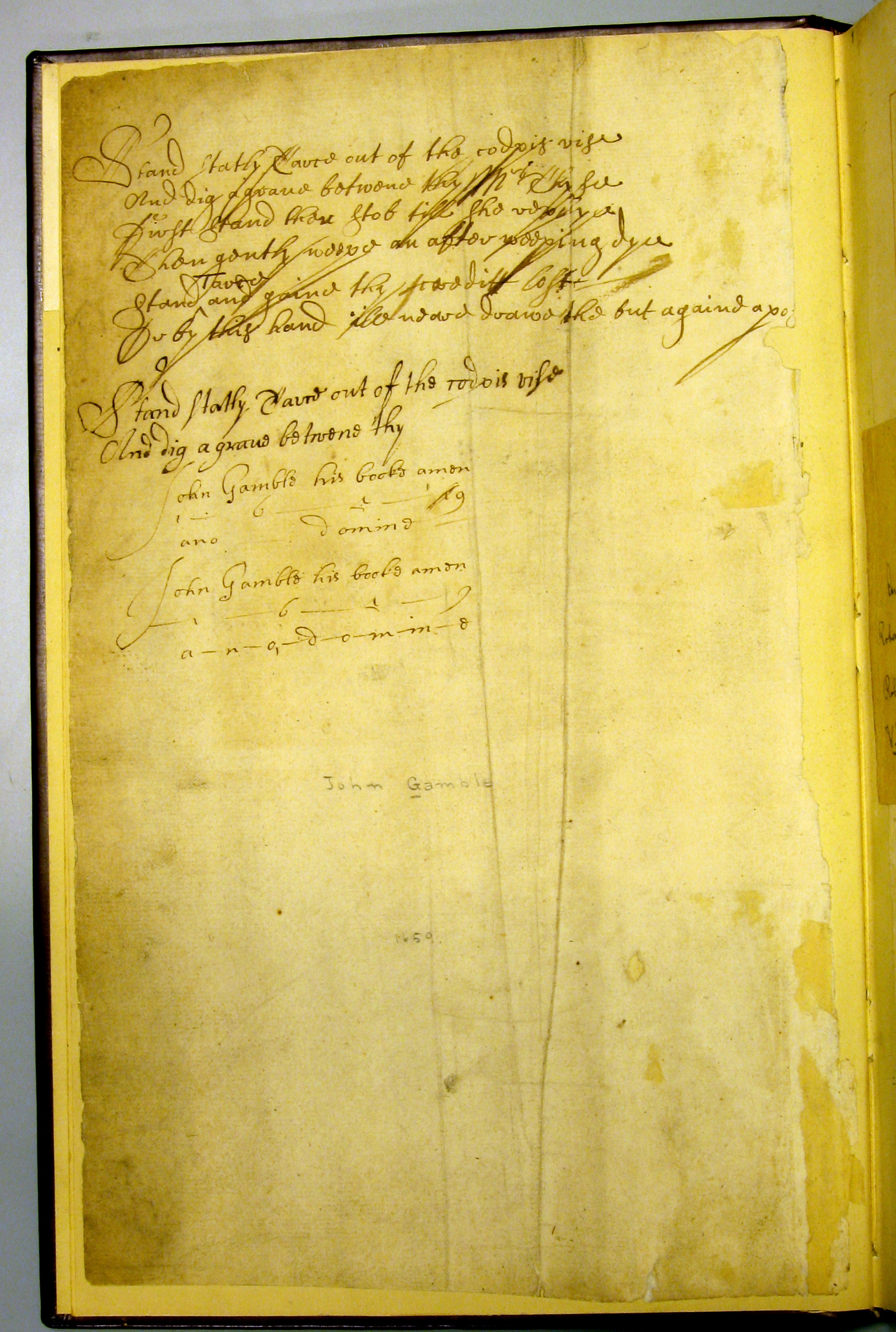
Folio 1v, containing a bawdy lyric and the inscription "John Gamble his booke ..." (click for close up)

Though writers disagree on details of the handwriting (see the section on handwriting below), they all agree that the handwriting of the latter portion of Drexel 4257 is probably that of John Gamble, given that there is a concentration of his work in that part of the manuscript. This suggests that the book was begun by someone else (whom Lynn Hulse recognized as Thomas Jordan; see below). Duckles surmised that Gamble came into possession of the book in 1642–43 when the musicians of the Royal Chapel were dispersed as a result of the English Civil War. Although Gamble lost most of his possessions in a fire in 1666, this book appears to have survived. He made out his will on 30 June 1680, in which he bequeathed his grandson (also named John Gamble) all his books of music.

After Gamble's death in 1687, nothing is known of the manuscript for over 150 years. The first published reference to it comes in 1846, where it is mentioned in volume 19 of the Percy Society's Early English Poetry, Ballads, and Popular Literature of the Middle Ages as being in the possession of one of the editors of the series, Edward Francis Rimbault. An organist and musicologist, Rimbault took a keen interest in English music and voraciously collected rare books, scores, and valuable manuscripts. Upon his death, his extensive and valuable library was auctioned by Sotheby's over the course of five days. The Rimbault auction catalog entry for the Gamble manuscript reads:

A collection of upwards of 300 songs by Wilson, Lawes, Johnson, Gamble, and other English composers, containing also the autograph inscription, "John Gamble his book, Amen. 1659 Anno Domini"

Hughes quotes a contemporaneous report of the hammer price and comment: "Thirteen guineas, for America." The reference was to the Philadelphia-born financier Joseph W. Drexel who had already amassed a large music library and purchased about 300 lots from the Rimbault auction. Upon Drexel's death, he bequeathed his music library to The Lenox Library. When the Lenox Library merged with the Astor Library to become the New York Public Library, the Drexel Collection became the basis for one of its founding units, the Music Division. Today, Drexel 4257 is part of the Drexel Collection in the Music Division, now located at the New York Public Library for the Performing Arts at Lincoln Center.

== Organization ==
Duckles noted that there are subsidiary groups organized by composer: Henry Lawes (nos. 26–36), William Webb (nos. 160–166), Robert Smith (nos. 237–238), Thomas Brewer (nos. 244–245), Robert Johnson (nos. 108–109), and John Gamble (nos. 292–319). Similarly is the group of three songs set by John Wilson for Richard Brome's play "The Northern Lass" (nos. 45, 46, and 47).

The first 47 songs are love lyrics by poets of the Jacobean Court, including Ben Jonson, William Shakespeare, Robert Herrick, Thomas Carew, John Suckling, Beaumont and Fletcher. After no. 47 a new spirit is suggested by song no. 48 "You madcapps of England that merry will make," a lusty drinking song that indicates a political shift after 1640. Deliberate segregation is in evidence between songs nos. 48 and 80, where there are a series of 32 ballads and popular songs, in contrast to the art lyrics of the first few songs. There is a brief return to the elevated nature in songs nos. 154–76. Thereafter, popular and sophisticated songs are mixed.

== Handwriting ==
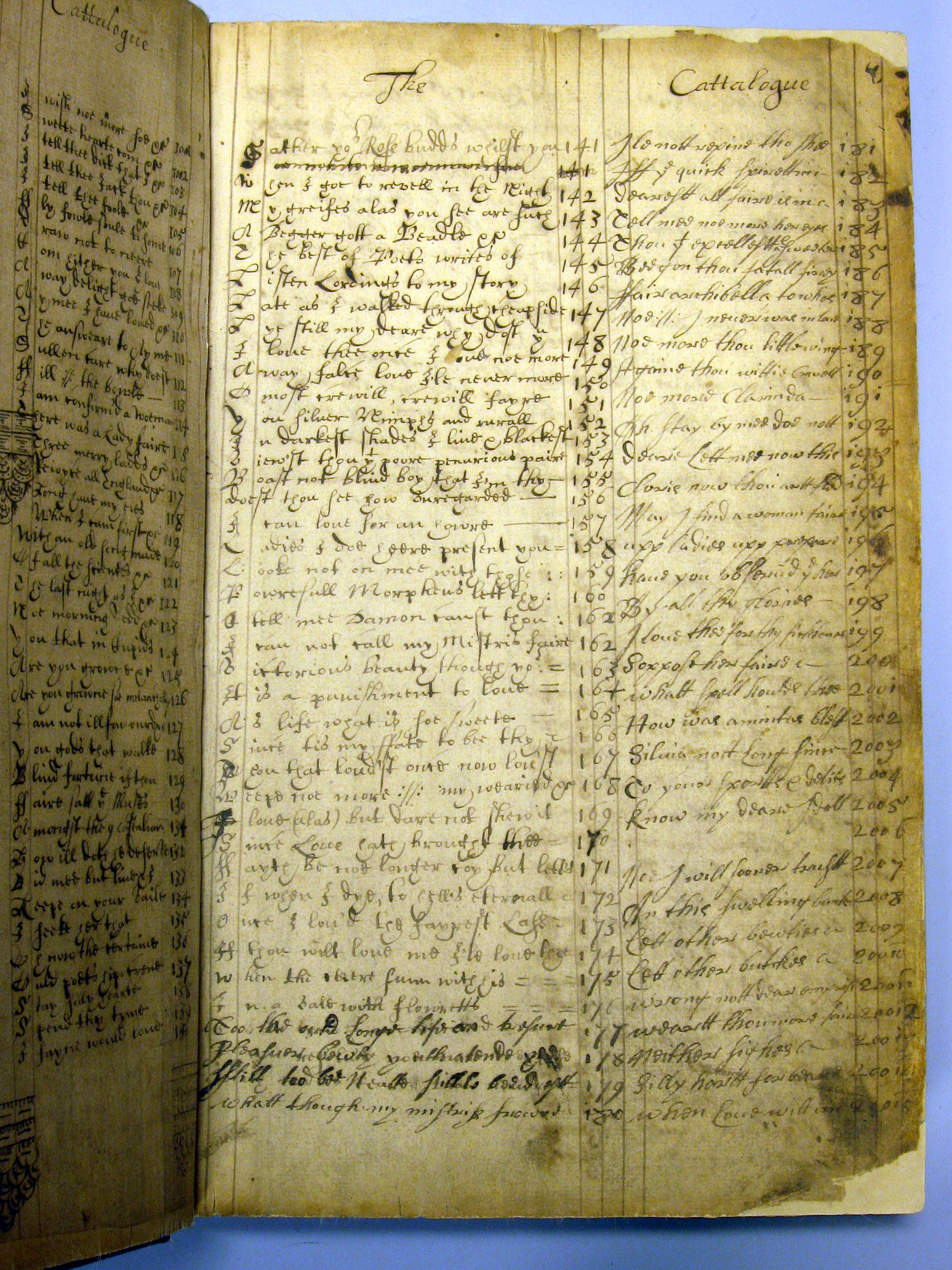
Folio 3 recto, showing a portion of "The Cattalogue" with contributions from all three hands

Hughes and Duckles both believed that the manuscript was written by at least two individuals. Hughes characterized the first hand as a "neater, older hand" dating from either at the end of the 16th century or beginning of the 17th century (a date disputed by subsequent writers - see above). The second hand copied the newer songs (including some by Gamble) and were written in a more careless hand. Hughes believed that this evidence suggested that the manuscript was begun by an unidentified person and was continued by John Gamble himself commencing with song no. 177.

Following Hughes's view, Duckles also believed the manuscript was written in two hands. In his view, the first hand wrote the titles for songs nos. 1-176 of the Catalogue, and the second hand, probably that of Gamble himself, wrote of nos. 177-266 (leaving space left to accommodate future additions) as well as the alphabetical index. Duckles described the writing style of Hand 1 as favoring "round, compact letter forms, vertical alignment, calligraphic flourishes on capitals and heavy down strokes," when writing with a broad pen. Duckles admits that Hand 1 has "two forms": "When the hand writes with a finer quill, the letter forms are more loosely connected, the flourishes a little more pronounced, and there is a slight inclination to the right." Hand no. 2 has a "pronounced slant to the right, letter forms are thin and elongated and the pen is a fine one." Duckles observed that hand no. 2 participated slightly in the preparation of part 1 (nos. 1–176) with only six songs, but all of the text incipits. Likes Hughes, Duckles also felt that Hand 2 is probably that of Gamble.

Duckles hypothesized that the first hand might have been that of Ambrose Beeland, with whom Gamble apprenticed and is believed to have been his teacher. Lynn Hulse refutes this, saying that the handwriting does not match existing Beeland manuscripts.

Jorgens disagreed with both Hughes and Duckles and saw three different hands. Based on the two tables of contents, Jorgens surmised that all three copyists had access to the book at one time. She characterized the first hand as "firm, bold but well-controlled secretary hand," the second hand as "looser and somewhat lighter secretary hand" beginning with song no. 38, and a third hand, "rougher, slanted, inclined towards the Italian style" that begins with song no. 46. All three roughly equal; by no. 177 the first two have dropped out. Hand Three has entered all of Gamble's songs and is probably his. It also has entered text incipits. Since these incipits do not correspond with other known songs, they are probably the work of Gamble.

Hulse identified the first hand of the Gamble manuscript is probably that of poet Thomas Jordan (ca. 1612–1685), the same hand as manuscript PwV18 in the University of Nottingham, as well as other Jordan manuscripts in Harvard University and Bodleian Library. Hulse showed that Jordan and Gamble were involved in the same London circle of theatre musicians and composers for many years, culminating in Jordan's preface for Gamble's A Defence for Musick published in 1659. She identifies songs nos. 4, 16, 32, 45, 47, 99, 154, 155, 169, 170, 175, 176 and the text incipit of 96 as being copied by Jordan.

== Politics ==
The lyrics to a number of songs have references to contemporary politics and events. "Since Itt hath bin lately inacted high Treason" (no. 313) carries a strong suggestion of reaction to contemporary British history. One song, "Beat on, proud billows," was known to have been written by Roger L'Estrange while he was imprisoned in Newgate Prison during Oliver Cromwell's rule (1645–1648).

Some songs express regret for a better past. "Listen iolly gentlemen Listen & be merry" (no. 63) praises the reign of Charles I (indirectly criticizing the then-current regime). The lyric of "Reioyce all England" contrasts the 13th-century hero Guy of Warwick with current rulers. One song alludes to the marital difficulties between Charles II and his Portuguese wife, Catherine of Braganza. Another example of distrust of foreigners can be seen in the lyric "Harke harke Ile tell you news from the Cort ... all ye french ... now are all sent back to France." Charles II also figures in "God bless our noble king," which comically describes the king's progress from Whitehall to St Paul's Cathedral.

"You madcaps of England" describes frivolous English soldiers at the siege of La Rochelle, including characters named "Wentworth" (referring to Thomas Wentworth, 1st Earl of Strafford) and "Murrey" (referring to Robert Moray). Other names mentioned include: Wilmot, Weston, George Symon, Steadlinge, Hugh Pollerd, and "Game" possibly John Gamble.

Some songs reveal prejudice against Puritans. No. 92, ""Cock Lorrell inuited ye diuell his gestt," concerns Cock Lavorel, known as a rogue and highway robber, as friends with the devil. "The purelings of the Citty" (no. 70) is an exception, praising a Protestant service.

Duckles took note of the bold lyrics to song no. 73:

Ye giddy poets that purloin
from sea and land the greatest store
to deck her ffading wenches fine,
what would you do with such a whore?

Duckles clarified the meaning: "The outspoken vulgarity was not necessarily result of personal taste but a reflection of Royalist protest against Puritan morality, intended to shock the taste of Parliamentarians."

== Topical or literary content ==
Hughes argued that, unlike a textbook compilation of exemplars, Drexel 4257 shows a variety of good and mediocre poetry. Most songs deal with love, and range from flowery rhetoric to frank accounts of love-making. A few, however, deal with topical matters. There are two songs related to Christmas: "Beate upp a dromm" depicts feasters in a mock battle with the cold in which the feasters win, and "Christmas is my name ffar have I gone" was a popular ballad which appeared in a number of 17th-century sources. In this song, the personification of Christmas comes from far away to discover that his friends and other residents have deserted the country in favor of the city. The song concludes with a lament that universal welcome is gone because the Protestants and Puritans disassociate themselves from Christmas. Similarly (with fewer political overtones), the song "Ladies you loose yor time" expresses preference for city life over that of the country.

The song "Oh yt mine eyes", a graphic meditation on the Crucifixion of Jesus, is the only song in the collection to deal with a religious subject.

The song "Nor loue nor fate dare I" by John Wilson bears the inscription "composed for the comedy The Northern Lass". Although this is the only song that the manuscript indicates is from a drama, at least 26 songs have texts from dramas or masques, attesting to Gamble's association with the theatre.

The songs composed by Gamble are best characterized as drolls. Drolls were collections of "cavalier wit, much of it trivial, repetitious and derivative, but at the same time containing some work of genuine literary value. Their tone was seldom dignified, often frankly sexual, and characterized by a persistent undertone of anti-Puritan feeling." Similar examples can be found in the work of Ben Jonson, Thomas Carew and John Suckling.

== Musical content and style ==
Hughes cursorily observed that Drexel 4257 contains no naturals—sharps are used to cancel flats, and flats are used to cancel sharps. He noted that technical blunders such as parallel fifths and octaves are to be found as well as other kinds of mistakes.

Duckles's dissertation explores the transition from the lute song, representing an older style of composition appropriate to the waning of Renaissance music, to the continuo song, reflecting newer Baroque music practice. It's not always an easy form of composition to assess: lutes were not always used for songs, and sometimes were used even after ascendancy of the continuo song. General characteristics of the lute song are smooth, flowing, and restrained lines, while the continuo song is more vigorous, abrupt and discontinuous. The harmonies in lute songs are an outgrowth of their melodic lines, while in continuo songs they define the structure. Lute songs tend to be loose and melismatic with frequent repetitions of verse fragments, while continuo songs are more closely tied to the rhythm of the text. Dissonance and chromaticism are used sparingly in lute songs while continuo songs show increasing use of chromaticism for more dramatic rather than pictorial underscoring. Generally, English composers were more concerned with capturing verbal rhythms than producing dramatic effects.(Hughes noted that Restoration lyrics typified Baroque figures of speech in their use of florid lyrics.) Use of these techniques in England indicate their adoption from Italy, where they were first used. Previously, it had been thought that English composers either didn't know about them, or weren't interested. But a comparison of Drexel 4257 with another of Gamble's books in the British Library, Additional 11608, where some of the songs appear in an embellished form, indicate that British composers and singers did occasionally adopt a more florid style.

Duckles examined the song "If Loue loues truth then woemen doe not loue" by Thomas Campion which appears as no. 10 of Drexel 4257 and was also published in Campion's Third Book of Ayres from about 1617. Campion was generally a conservative composer. In the version present in Drexel 4257, the melody is slightly altered to provide greater sensitivity to the declamatory text, so that the speed of the verse accelerates naturally, an alteration which Duckles finds an improvement over the original. Many songs are recitative-like. In some of these songs, the bar is enlarged as it approaches the cadence, suggesting a ballad singer who briefly pauses to catch his breath. The hemiola a consistent practice in English music of this time.

Many songs are 6/4 meter, while some suggest that they are adaptations from violin tunes. Yet, the barline does not always reflect the verbal rhythm. In comparing the song "Ballowe my babe lye still and sleepe", no. 46 of Drexel 4257, with the version that appears in Elizabeth Rogers' Virginal Book, Duckles notes that the (earlier) virginal version is in duple meter with no trace of hemiolas, while the version in the Gamble manuscript has them, suggesting a modernization of an older song. Another example of continuo style is "Like Hermitt poore in pensiue place obscure" (no. 15), a lyric attributed to Sir Walter Raleigh and dating from 1591. In comparing Alfonso Ferrabosco's setting from his Ayres of 1609 to one by Nicolas Lanier in Drexel 4257, Duckles admits the possibility that Lanier's may have been inspired by that of Ferrabosco. But the musical characteristics of the Lanier setting, including simplicity of texture, distinct phrases, use of an échappée, and the suggestion of a rhythmic motif through use of a recurring pattern of eighth notes, point to contemporary text setting techniques. The song "Drowsie sun, why dostt thou stay" by Thomas Brewer (no. 253) shows expressive false relations and harmonic word painting, foreshadowing later developments in British sacred music. Brewer's songs are among the earliest examples of the Italian pathetic style in English music and represent the mature style of continuo song. Devices such as an octave leap look away from lute song to continuo song.

Not all songs with recitative-like musical lines indicate modernism.There are dance songs that contain elements of an ostinato bass, passamezzo antico and the romanesca—all characteristics of Renaissance rather than Baroque periods. Several tunes and texts are of 16th-century origin had long been in the repertoire, among them: "Greensleeves," "O mistress mine," and "Back and sides go bare." With these exceptions, the earliest songs date from Jacobean period. A comparison with anthologies published by John Playford in 1652, 1653 and 1659 indicates particular songs were popular. That selections were copied into the book attests to their popularity even after tastes had changed due to the Restoration. Similarly, the song "I went from England into ffrance," a satirical narrative, refers to the song "John Dory," indicating that song's continued popularity. (It had appeared in Thomas Ravenscroft's "Deuteromelia" of 1609, though probably dates earlier). "When ye Chill Charockoe blowes" is a song containing both declamatory and tuneful styles. It is a drinking song, whose erratic harmony suggests frequent cadences, and whose angular melody which "moves with great vigor," This is in contradistinction to the lute song that emphasized continuous flow and smooth melodic motion.

Duckles identifies two styles of songs of the collection: "The declamatory air" (reflecting modern style), and "the tuneful air" (reflecting the older style, a vestige of Renaissance musical practice). The tuneful air could be composed based on a preexisting tune or a tune intended to be a dance form. In examining lyric forms, Duckles identified the ballad as one type of lute song. The ballads found in Drexel 4257 are all of a sophisticated type in which satire and parody are important elements. The ballad as simple narrative or topical ballad are not represented.

Warning that one must be wary of the fluid nature of musical genres, Duckles categorized the following songs from Drexel 4257 as ballads: 46, 48, 49, 51, 53, 55, 56, 58, 59, 60, 62, 63, 64, 66, 67, 68, 70, 74, 76, 79, 92, 103, 104, 105, 116, 119, 120, 121, 123, 131, 142, 144, 145, 146, 147, 186, 214, 271, 272.

Duckles identified these songs as being in the declamatory style: 4, 12, 15, 20, 22, 26, 30, 31, 33, 83, 89, 108, 132, 160, 161, 162, 164, 168, 172, 182, 188, 198, 206, 238, 239, 240, 243, 247, 249, 253, 256, 260, 261, 262, 269, 274, 277, 280, 284, 285, 292, 299, 306, 311, 315, 316, 317, 323, 326.

Duckles observes that by 1651, the transition from the lute song to the continuo song was complete. Printed versions of songs can not be entirely trusted to represent what was sung, since, in order to keep engraving costs manageable, they would economize on written vocal embellishments. That's why manuscript sources are crucial to our understanding of transition to Baroque vocal styles. Duckles concludes by warning that those who study early 17th century lyric poetry must do so in conjunction with their intended musical settings, since words and music are inseparable.

== Significance ==
In his dissertation, Duckles summed up Gamble and his manuscript:

There seems to be little doubt but that Gamble's fame will rest upon his work as a compiler of an important song collection, not on his work as a composer. As a musician he was distinctly second-rate, but one can appreciate him as a man with a keen sense of the musical currents (page 138) of his time, an opportunist, who knew what the public wanted and how to turn public taste to his own professional uses ... By shrewdness and wit he managed to establish a place for himself in the rough-and-tumble world of mid-17th century music. His songs were soon forgotten, but in his "Commonplace book," compiled without any thought for posterity, he succeeded in presenting one of the most valuable sources we have of the musical taste and musical thought of his time. It is for this reason that an obscure court musician of some 300 years ago remains very much alive in the minds of students of English music history.

== List of songs ==
This table is based on the table of contents listed in Jorgens, supplemented with composer, lyricist attributions and other remarks from Duckles 1953.

No.	Title	Composer	Lyricist	Remarks
1	Must yor fayre enflameing eie			
2	See the chariott at hand heere of loue		Ben Jonson	From the drama The Devil is an Ass
3	Aske mee noe more whether doth stray		Thomas Carew	
4	Thoughts doe not vex mee while I sleepe	John Wilson	William Strode	
5	Deare why doe you say you loue		Robert Aytoun	
6	Not that I wish my Mistris more faire		William Herbert, 3rd Earl of Pembroke (10th Creation)	
7	Though my Mistris seeme in shew		Thomas Heywood	
8	In yor fayre cheekes 2 pitts doe lye		Thomas Carew	
9	Oh that my toung had beene as dumb			
10	If Loue loues truth then woemen doe not loue	Thomas Campion	Thomas Campion	
11	Hee yt lou's a rosy cheeke	Henry Lawes	Thomas Carew	
12	Hearke hearke how in euery groue	William Lawes?	James Shirley	
13	Goe thy wayes since thou wilt goe			
14	Happy is he that hath yor veiw			
15	Like Hermitt poore in pensiue place obscure	Nicholas Lanier	Walter Raleigh	
16	Take oh take those lippes away	John Wilson	William Shakespeare	From the drama Measure for Measure; also used in the drama The Bloody Brother
17	Dearest doe not now delay mee	Henry Lawes	Francis Beaumont and John Fletcher	From the drama The Spanish Curate
18	Thou sent'st to mee a hearte was crown'd		Robert Aytoun	
19	Why should passion lead the[e] blind		William Herbert, 3rd Earl of Pembroke (10th Creation)	
20	Two of the brightest starrs in heauen			
21	Be not proud nor coy nor crewill	Henry Lawes		
22	Cupid call's com Louers com		James Shirley	
23	Loue where is now thy Deity	John Withy	Richard Brome	
24	Wt should my Mistris doe wth hayre	William Lawes	James Shirley	From the drama The Duke's Mistress
25	If I freely might discouer	Henry Lawes	Ben Jonson	From the drama The Poetaster
26	Sleepe old man lett silence charme thee	Henry Lawes	William Habington	
27	Sweete I am not com to soone	Henry Lawes	William Habington	
28	Must wee bee diuided now	Henry Lawes		
29	Why should only man be tyed	Henry Lawes?	William Habington	
30	Greife com away and doe not thou refuse	Henry Lawes		
31	Goe thou gentle whispering wynd	Henry Lawes	Thomas Carew	
32	In a Mayden tyme possessed	John Wilson	Thomas Middleton	From the drama The Witch
33	Selfe blinding error seazeth all those mindes	Henry Lawes	William Shakespeare	From Sonnet 126
34	Art thou gone in hast?	Henry Lawes	John Webster	From the drama The Thracian Wonder
35	Tell mee deerest what is loue		Francis Beaumont and John Fletcher	From the drama The Captain; also from the drama The Knight of the Burning Pestle
36	Neuer more will I protest		Francis Beaumont and John Fletcher	
37	Beauties haue you seene a toy	Henry Lawes	Ben Jonson	From the masque at Lord Hadington's marriage
38	Amidst the Mirtles as I walk't	Henry Lawes	Robert Herrick	
39	Thou shepheard whose intentive eye	Henry Lawes	H. Townshend	Same tune as previous song
40	Of thee kind boy I aske noe Redd and white	Nicholas Lanier	John Suckling	
41	In fayth I cannot keepe my sheepe			
42	Fullwell I knowe my greifes alas			Same tune as No. 193
43	Some say ladies are modest			Text only
44	Shepheard wheare hast thou ben			Text only
45	A bonny bird a bird I haue	John Willson	Richard Brome	From the drama The Northern Lass
46	Ballowe my babe lye still and sleepe	William Lawes?		From the drama The Northern Lass
47	As I was gathering Aprill flowers	John Wilson	Richard Brome	From the drama The Northern Lass
48	You madcapps of England that merry will make			Text only
49	God bless our noble kinge			
50	Heare's a health to all good fellows			Text only
51	Come hither the merriest of all the nine			Set to the same tune as no. 74
52	Now out vpon this foolinge			
53	Hey hoe Care goe get thee gon from me			
54	Say louely Phillis since it thy will is	Henry Lawes		Corrupted and incomplete
55	Backe and sides goe bare goe bare			
56	Beate upp a dromm now winter Reignes			
57	Since Fortune thou art growne soe kind			
58	There was a mayde this other day			
59	My Masters & Freinds who soeuer intends			
60	Christmas is my name farr haue I gone			Treble only
61	In a greene meadowe / a river runinge by			
62	I went from England into France		Richard Corbet	
63	Lissen iolly gentlemen Listen & be merry			
64	I am a Rogue and a stout one			
65	Shall I be slaue vnto a womans will			
66	The Aphorismes of Gallen I hould but a toy			Incomplete
67	I met with ye devell in the shape of a Ramme		Francis Beaumont and John Fletcher	From the drama Beggars' Bush
68	Come followe followe me all you yt drunkards be			Text only
69	Let souldiers fight for pay and prayse		Aurelian Townshend	From the drama Lady Hatton's Masque
70	The purelinges of the Citty			
71	True loue noe more shall live on earth			Text only
72	Noe sherrie new but sherrie ould			
73	Yee giddy Poets that purloyne			Text only
74	Come hither ye merriest of all ye land			Set to the same tune as no. 51
75	Though Murrey be vndoubtedly his Countries cheifest witt		Peter Apsley	Text only
76	I bring noe scurffe nor Leprosie			
77	As I lay musing on [= one] nightt in my bed			
78	The blushinge rose & purple flower		Philip Massinger	Dialogue; from the drama The Picture
79	Ther was a certaine Idle kind off creature			Text incipit only
80	Thou art not fayre for all thy redd and white		Thomas Campion	
81	Why should greate beauties vertuous fame desire	William Lawes	William Davenant	
82	Cause thou artt fickle shall I Loue thee			Text incipit only
83	Fier fier loe heere I bume in such desire	Nicholas Lanier	Thomas Campion	
84	Outt upon itt I haue Lou'd		John Suckling	Text incipit only
85	A nymph whenas ye summers beames			
86	Say Celia say why wee twoe proue			
87	I saw Faire Cloris walke alone		William Strode	Text incipit only
88	Doe nott to a woman sue			Text incipit only
89	Noe ://: fayre Heretick it needes must bee	Lawes	John Suckling	From the drama Aglaura; ascribed elsewhere to Henry Lawes but possibly by William Lawes
90	Noe ://: I tell thee noe			Text incipit only
91	Com Eccho I thee summon			Text only
92	Cock Lorrell inuited ye diuell his gestt		Ben Jonson	From the drama The Gypsies Metamorphosed; text only
93	Foolish boy Forbeare and Fly			Text incipit only
94	Harke ://: Ile tell you newes from the Cort			Text only
-				One blank page
95	Mars Bachus and the blind boy of late			Text only
96	From ye Faire Lauinnian shore			Text incipit only
-				One blank page
97	Why should I wronge my iudgmt soe			Text only
98	You meaner beautyes of the night		Henry Wotton	
99	Nor Loue nor fate dare I accuse	John Wilson	Richard Brome	From the drama The Northern Lass
100	Stay oh stay why dostt thou Fly mee	John Wilson		
101	I wish noe more thou wouldst loue me			Text only
102	Sweet hart come & kiss me			Text only
103	I tell the [ = thee] Dicke that I haue beene		John Suckling	Text only
-				Three blank pages
104	I tell thee Jack thou hast given the king			Text only
105	I tell thee Foole		John Suckling	Text incipit only
106	Fly fowle soule to some forsaken hill			From an unidentified masque
107	Draw nott to nere, unless you dropp a teare		William Strode	Text incipit only
108	Come hither you yt loue and heare mee sing	Robert Johnson	Francis Beaumont and John Fletcher	From the drama The Captain; attribution added in later hand
109	Away delight goe seeke som other dwelling	Robert Johnson	Francis Beaumont and John Fletcher	From the drama The Captain
110	Aye mee I haue loued Longe			Text incipit only
111	The answeare to Aye me			Listed in Cattalogue but missing from space provided for no. 111
112	Sullen Care why dost thou keepe	William Lawes		
113	Fill fill the bowIe the Lustie wine will dye	William Lawes		
114	I am confirm'd a woman can	Henry Lawes	John Suckling	
115	There was a Lady faire and kind			
116	Three mery ladds mett at the Rose			Text only
117	Reioyce all England & be merry and gladd			Text only
118	Long haue mine eies gaz'd with delight		Thomas Campion	
119	When I cam first to London towne			
120	With an old song made by an old antient pate			Text only
121	Of all the scienses vnder the sunn			
-				One blank page
122	The Lastt nightt as I Lay in bed			Text incipit only
-				One blank page
123	Noe mominge red		William Davenant	From the drama Love and Honor; text incipit only
124	You yt in Cupids nette			Text incipit only
125	Are you growne soe Fond & stupi[d]			Text incipit only
126	Are you growne soe mellencolly			Text incipit only
127	I am nott Ilfauourd [=ill favored]			Text incipit only
128	You godd yt walke			Text incipit only
-				One blank page
129	Blind Fortune iff thou wantt a guide			Text incipit only
130	Faire ssate ye muses yt in well chimd uerse		James Shirley	Text incipit only
131	Amongstt ye 9 Castillian sisters			Text incipit only
132	How ill doth he deserue a Louers name	Henry Lawes	Thomas Carew	bass incomplete
133	Bid me but live and I will live	Henry Lawes	Robert Herrick (poet)	
134	Keepe on yor vayle and hide yor Eye	Henry Lawes	William Strode	
135	I seeke her that flyes me			
136	0 nowe the certaine cause I knowe	Henry Lawes	William Cartwright	treble only
137	Ould poets Hypocreene admire	Henry Lawes	Thomas Randolph	
138	Silly hartt Forbeare			Text incipit only; listed in Cattalogue as Stay silly hearte; entire song at No. 214
139	Spend thy time som other way			Text incipit only
140	I Faine would Loue my Celia too dayse more			
141	Gather your Rosbuds whilstt you may	William Lawes	Robert Herrick (poet)	
142	When I goe to reuill in ye nightt			Text incipit only
-				One blank page
143	My greiffes allas [you see are such]			Text incipit only
144	A Begger gott a beadle		Martin Parker	Text incipit only
-				One blank page
145	The bestt off poetts write off Froggs			Text incipit only
-				One blank page
146	Listen Lordings to my story			Text incipit only
147	Late as I walked through Cheapside			Text only
148	Lye still my deare [why dost yu]			Text incipit only
149	I loue thee once I loue noe more		Robert Aytoun	
150	Away False Loue [Ile never more]			Text incipit only
151	0 mostt Crewell Crewell Faire			Text only
152	You sliuer nimphes [and rurall]			Text incipit only
153	In darckest shades I livd and blackest night			Incomplete
154	Viewst thou that poore penurious payre of Louers	John Wilson		
155	Boast not blind boy that I'me thy prize	John Willson		
156	Doest see how vnregaurded now	John Atkins?	John Suckling	
157	I can loue for an hower	John Atkins?		
158	Ladyes I doe heere preesent you			
159	Looke not on mee wth those eies			
160	Powerfull Morpheus let thy charmes	William Webb		
161	Oh tell mee Damon canst thou proue			
162	I can not call my Mistris faire			
163	Victorious beauty though yor eies	William Webb	Aurelian Townshend	
164	It is a punishment to loue		Abraham Cowley	From the drama Love's Riddle
165	As life wt is soe sweete	William Webb		
166	Since 'tis my fate to be thy Slaue	William Webb		
167	Thou that lou'dst once now lou'st noe more		Robert Aytoun	
168	Weepe noe more ://: my wearied eyes	Nicholas Lanier	Thomas Campion?	From the Masque for the Marriage of the Earl of Somerset and Lady Frances Howard; same melody as the song Bring away this sacred tree
169	I loue alas but can not shew it	John Wilson		treble only
170	Since Loue hath brought thee and I haue caught thee	John Wilson		treble only
171	Faith be noe longer coy but letts enioy	William Lawes		
172	Iff when I dye to hells etemall shade		William Fowler	
173	Once I lou'd ye Fairestt Lass			
174	If thou wilt loue me I'le loue thee			Listed in Cattalogue but missing in ms.; song given at no. 216
175	When the cleare Sunn with his beames hott	John Wilson		
176	In a vale with flowretts spangled	John Wilson		
177	To the old longe life and treasure		Ben Jonson	From the drama The Gypsies Metamorphized
178	Pleasure, bewtie youth atend yee	William Lawes	John Ford	From the drama The Lady's Trial
179	Still to bee neate, still to bee drestt	William Lawes	Ben Jonson	From the drama Epicœne, or The silent woman
180	Whatt though my mistres frowne on mee			
181	lIe nott repine though shee bee proud			same tune as No. 180
182	Iff ye quick spirett in your eye	Henry Lawes	Thomas Carew	
183	Dearestt all faire is in your brow	William Lawes		
184	Tell mee noe more her eyes are like	William Lawes		
185	Thou yt excellestt, & sweeter smellestt	William Lawes		
186	Beegon thou fatale fierey feauour			
187	Fair archibella, to thine eyes	John Tailor		
188	Noe noe, I neuer was in loue	Henry Lawes		
189	Noe more thou litle winged archer		Thomas Wortley	Text only
190	Againe, thou wittie cruell wanton			Text only
191	Noe more Clarinda shall thy Charmes			
192	Oh stay by mee, doe nott fly mee			
193	Deare lett mee now, this eu'eninge dye		William Davenant	Same tune as No. 42
194	Cloris now thou artt fled away	Henry Lawes	Henry Hughes	
195	May I find a woman faire		Francis Beaumont and John Fletcher	Text only
196	Upp ladies up, prepare your takinge faces	William Lawes		
197	Haue you obseru'd ye hermitt, when hee runns	John Gamble		
198	By all thy glories willingly I goe	Henry (or William) Lawes?	Thomas Jordan	
199	I loue thee for thy ficklenes, and greate inconstancie	Henry (or William) Lawes?		
200	Suppose her faire, supose I know'itt	William Lawes		
201	Whatt spell houlds thee my sunn from risinge	John Gamble	Edward Filmer, translator	Text only
202	How was amintas blestt, whos death butt fained	John Gamble	Edward Filmer, translator	Text only
203	Siluia, nott longe since halfe afrighted	John Gamble	Edward Filmer, translator	Text only
204	To your sportts & delights yee blith lasses	John Gamble	Edward Filmer, translator	Text only
205	Know my dear Idoll Cloris, yt all zealous	John Gamble	Edward Filmer, translator	Text only
-				No song listed in Cattalogue nor in manuscript
206	Noe I will sooner trustt ye wind	Charles Coleman	Thomas Stanley	
207	On this swellinge bank	Henry Lawes	Thomas Stanley	
208	Lett other bewties haue the power			Text only
209	Lett other buttkes [= buttocks] haue ye power			Text only
210	Wronge nott deare empriss off my hart		Robert Aytoun	
211	Wea'rtt thou more fairer then thou art		Thomas Stanley	
212	Neither sighes nor teares nor mouminge	Nicholas Lanier		Attributed to Nicholas Lanier in printed sources
213	Silley hartt forbeare those are murdringe eyes	Nicholas Lanier		
214	When Loue wth unconfined wings		Richard Lovelace	Text only
215	Iff thou wiltt loue mee ile loue thee againe			
216	Com dear phillis letts bee goeinge			
217	God off warr to Cupid yield		James Shirley	From the drama Love Tricks, or The School of Compliment
218	You thatt sportt like uenus doues			Text only
-				Next thirty-four items incorrectly altered in Cattalogue to 30020, etc.
219	Why should'stt thou sweare I am forswome	Thomas Charles	Richard Lovelace	
220	Com prethee fancie letts consultt			Text incipit only
221	Iff to bee absentt were to bee, away from thee	Henry Lawes	Richard Lovelace	
222	Why sligh'stt thou her whome I aproue	John Atkins?	Henry King	
-				Continuation of No. 223
223	Unfould thine armes and lett mee goe	Henry Lawes		
224	Though Cupid bee a god alas hees butt a boy	Henry Lawes		
225	Hee yt will courtt a wench yt is coy			Text incipit and stanzas two and three only
226	Prodegale faire beef ore to Late			
227	Bringe us up sum sacke and clarett	John Gamble		
228	I pray you louers giue mee leaue			
229	Tormentt off absence and delay	John Gamble	Thomas Stanley	Treble only
230	With endles teares yt neuer cease	Robert Johnson		
-				Two blank pages
231	A shepherd satt and did complaine him			
232	Greatt and proud iff shee deride mee			
233	Oh mee ye time is com to pass			
234	Come oh com I brooke noe stay	Henry Lawes	William Cartwright	From the drama The Ordinary
235	Hee yt did euer scome Loues mightt	Robertt Smith		
236	Shee wch would nott, I would choose	Robertt Smith	Thomas Randolph	
237	Keepe on your vaile & hide your eye	Henry Lawes	William Strode	Same as no. 134
238	Oh now I find tis noughtt butt fate	Henry Lawes	Henry Hughes	
239	Poore pensiue I orecharg'ed wth woe	Henry Lawes		
240	Oh giue mee Leaue to gaze a while			
241	You blushinge roses happie are	William Webb	William Habington	
242	Yes I could Loue could I butt find	Thomas Brewer		
243	Tell nott I dye, or yt I liue by thee	Thomas Brewer	John Tatham	From the drama Ostella
244	Shall I thinke beecause som Cloud		James Shirley	
245	Whatt charmes thou hastt faire nimph	William Webb		
246	Looke backe Castara from thine eye	William Webb	William Habington	
247	Marke how ye bashfull morne in uaine	Nicholas Lanier	Thomas Carew	Treble only; attributed to Nicholas Lanier in printed sources
248	When bleatinge Lambs shall Chase ye hungrey fox			
249	Greaue nott deare Loue, although wee often part	Henry Lawes	George Digby, 2nd Earl of Bristol	
250	Rose buds thats gather'd in ye springe	John Gamble		
251	Why should you bee soe full of spigh'tt			Text incipit only
252	Oh my Clarissa thou Crewell faire	William Lawes		
253	Drowsie sun, why dostt thou stay	Thomas Brewer		
254	When I by thy faire shape did sweare	William Lawes	Richard Lovelace	
255	Phillis bring those willowes heither			Text only
256	As on a day Clorinda faire was bathinge	Henry Lawes		
257	Shall I Like A hermitt dwell	Robert Johnson		
258	0 thatt mine eyes coold meltt into a floud	Thomas Brewer		
259	Little Loue serues my turne tis soe infflaminge	Henry Lawes		
260	When ye unfetterd subiectts off ye seas	John Atkins?		
261	When ye Chill Charockoe blowes	John Atkins	Thomas Bonham	
262	Thou dregg's off Lethey oh thou dull			
263	Lett nott thy bewty make thee proud	Henry Lawes	Aurelian Townshend	
264	How Coole and temprate am I growne	Henry Lawes		
-				Cattalogue at beginning of manuscript ends here
265	Bewtie and Loue once Fell att odds			Text only
266	The springe is Cominge on			Text only
267	Change platonickts Change For shame			
268	How happy art thee & I	Henry Lawes		
269	Well well tis trew; I am now Falne in Loue		Alexander Brome	
270	See see how careles men are growne	Henry Lawes		
271	Who shall now grace our plaines			Text only
272	My deare and only Loue take heed			
273	When Loue was younge and men were strange			Treble only
274	Ladies adue, noe more my eyes shall wander	John Gamble		
275	Stay, stay, prate noe more		Alexander Brome	Poem without musical staff
276	Iff thou do'st Loue mee as thou saistt	Henry Lawes		Treble only
277	How Cloris Can I ere beeliue	Henry Lawes	Charles Cotton	
-				One blank page
278	O'fftt haue I swome I'de neuer Loue	Henry Lawes	Henry Hughes	attributed to John Wilson in manuscript
279	Did you know whatt greefe I tooke			Text only
280	Shees gone, and yett thes woods apeare	John Wilson		for two voices
281	Renounce this humour and atend			Dialogue; treble only
282	You thatt are happie in your loues			Text only
283	A Chine off beife god saue us all	Edward Coleman	Thomas Flatman	With chorus for two voices
284	Clorinda when I goe away			
285	Ladies Fly From loues smooth tale	Henry Lawes	Thomas Carew	
286	Whatt meanes this strangeness now off late	Henry Lawes	Robert Aytoun	Treble only
287	Sett twentie thousand on a row			Treble only
288	Ladies I once say'd you were Faire			Treble only
289	Noe man loues Firey passion			
290	Cloris False loue made Clora weep	John Wilson		For two voices
291	Nay prethee doe bee coy & slightt mee	John Gamble	Alexander Brome	
292	Mistake mee nott; I am nott off yt mind	John Gamble	Alexander Brome	
293	Ile swer they lye, who say they loue	John Gamble	Henry Bold	
294	Cloris Forbeare a while, doe nott or'e loy mee	John Gamble	Henry Bold	
295	Faith doe butt say ye word & I am gon		Henry Bold	Text only
296	How Longe shall I a martyr bee	Henry Lawes	Henry Hughes	Treble only
297	Lett longinge louers sitt and pine	Henry Lawes	Henry Hughes	Treble only
298	Take heed Faire Cloris how you tame	Henry Lawes	Henry Hughes	Treble only
299	[Iff] welth could keepe a man aliue	John Gamble	Alexander Brome	For two voices
300	Com Chase away mad mallencolly		Henry Bold	Text incipit only
301	Faire giue mee leaue to loue, or loue to Leaue	John Gamble	Henry Bold	Text only
302	Stay wilde sinner, Cease thy suite	John Gamble	Henry Bold	Text only
303	Ladies you loose Yor time, whilstt you're From london			Text only
304	I loue, butt dare nott show'tt			
305	All ye materialls are ye same			
306	Silence your Charminge uoyce Phillis a while	John Gamble		For two voices with chorus
307	Now whightt halse [= Whitehall's] in a graue	John Caue	Richard Lovelace	
308	The mominge doth wastt, to the meadowes lets hastt	John Gamble		
309	The blessed shades, unhappy made	John Gamble		
310	Off all the rurall liues ther's none surpasses			Text only
311	When Firstt beefore Rosellas Face I lay	John Gamble		
312	Fair sinthe'a [= Cynthia] twice six times			
313	Since Itt hath bin lately in acted high Treason	Walter Youckney	Alexander Brome	Treble only
314	Lett whineinge Louers magneffie; To Fortune	John Gamble		Song not listed in alphabetical table
315	What will beecome off mee, t'me all; Off Celia	John Gamble		Song not listed in alphabetical table
316	Were Celia butt as Chastt as Faire; Off his Faire butt Lightt mistris	John Gamble		Song not listed in alphabetical table
317	Tis nott my [Ladies?] Face thatt makes mee Loue her	John Gamble	Alexander Brome	Treble only; song not listed in alphabetical table
-				One blank page
318	Fond Louers wt d'yee meane, to Courtt an idle Folly		William Cartwright	Text incipit only
319	Loue thee good Faith nott I	Henry Lawes	Henry Hughes	Bass incomplete
320	Lastt parliamentt satt, & ye speaker did prate		Henry Bold	Chorus incomplete
-				One blank page
321	Sure twas a dreame, how Longe Fond man			Text only
-				One blank page
322	Tis nott how wittie nor how Free		Aurelian Townshend	
323	Spare ye deuoutt adorers off your eyes			Treble only
324	I haue reason to Fly thee			Poem without musical staff
325	Now the states braynes are adle [= addled?]		Henry Bold	Treble only; continues after Song No. 3016
326	Beatt on proud billowes, boreas blow		Roger L'Estrange	
-				One blank page
327	Paintt painte noe more, noe Longer blott	Walter Youckney		Treble only

== Facsimile ==
A facsimile of the manuscript was published as Drexel Ms. 4257: John Gamble, "His booke, amen 1659", in English Song, 1600–1675: Facsimiles of Twenty-Six Manuscripts and an Edition of the Texts, vol. 10 (ISBN 978-0-8240-8240-6), by Garland Publishing of New York in 1987, with an introduction by Elise Bickford Jorgens.

== See also ==
- Drexel 4041
- Drexel Collection – Music collection of New York Public Library

== Bibliography ==
- Duckles, Vincent (1948), "The Gamble Manuscript as a Source of Continuo Song in England", Journal of the American Musicological Society, 1 (2): 23–40, doi:10.1525/jams.1948.1.2.03a00020 (inactive 12 July 2025)
- Duckles, Vincent (1953), John Gamble's Commonplace Book: A Critical Edition of New York Public Library MS Drexel 4257, University of California: Ph.D. dissertation
- Evans, Willa McClung (1936), "Lawes' Version of Shakespeare's Sonnet CXVI", Publications of the Modern Language Association of America, 51 (1): 120–122, doi:10.2307/458317, JSTOR 458317, S2CID 164166835
- Highfill, Philip H.; Burnim, Kalman A.; Langhans, Edward A. (1978), A Biographical Dictionary of Actors, Actresses, Musicians, Dancers, Managers & Other Stage Personnel in London, 1660–1800, vol. 16, Carbondale, IL: Southern Illinois University Press
- Hughes, Charles W. (Oct 1945), "John Gamble's Commonplace Book", Music and Letters, 26 (4): 215–29, doi:10.1093/ml/XXVI.4.215
- Hulse, Lynn (Feb 1996), "'Musick & Poetry, Mixed': Thomas Jordan's Manuscript Collection", Early Music, 24 (1): 7–24, doi:10.1093/earlyj/XXIV.1.7
- Jorgens, Elise Bickford (1987), Drexel Ms. 4257: John Gamble, "His booke, amen 1659, English Song, 1600–1675: Facsimiles of Twenty-Six Manuscripts and an Edition of the Texts, vol. 10, New York: Garland Publishing, ISBN 978-0-8240-8240-6
