= Drexel 4041 =

- New York Public Library for the Performing Arts
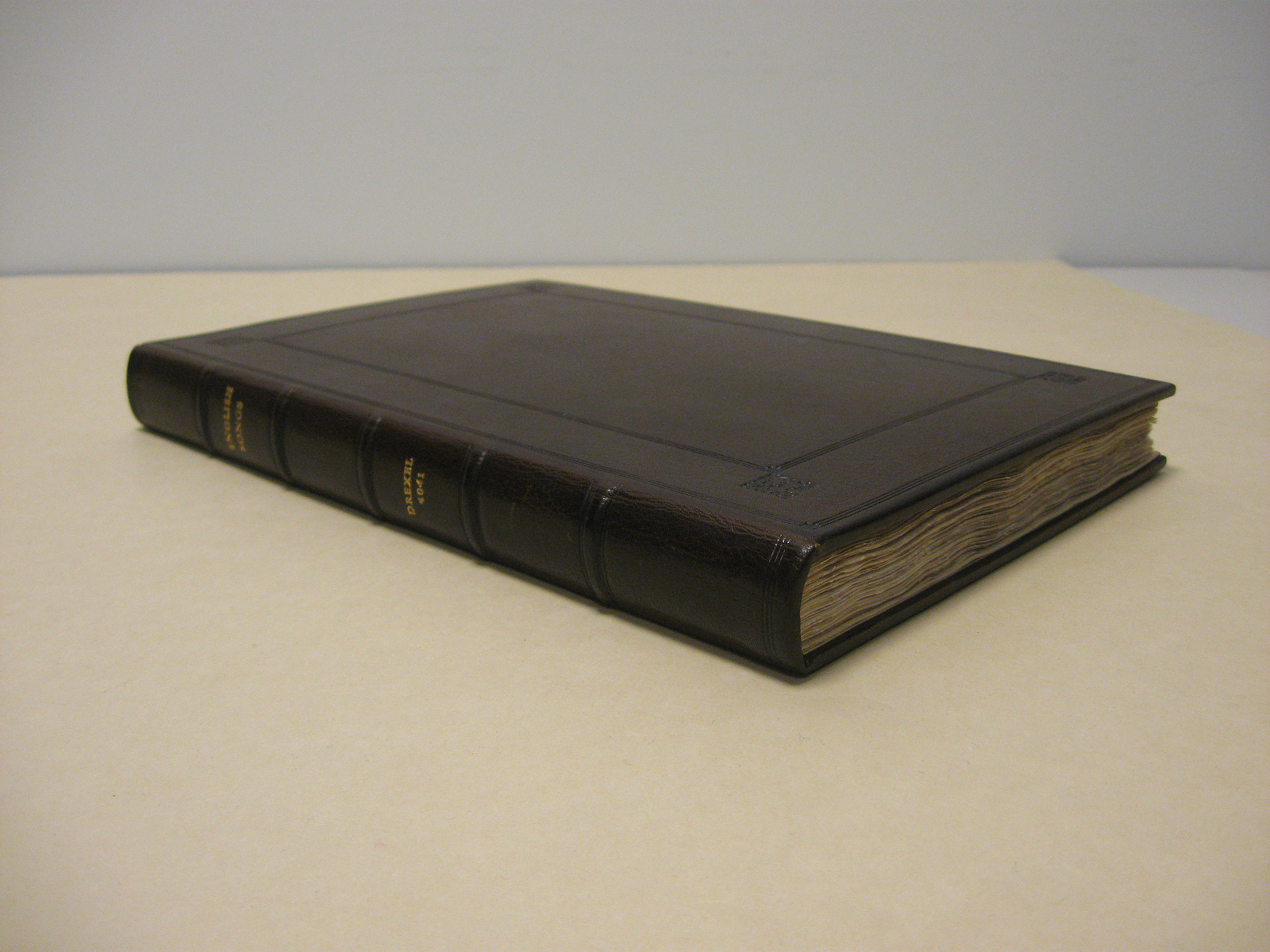
- Type: Commonplace book
- Date: Late 1640s
- Place of origin: England
- Language: English
- Size: 144 leaves

Drexel 4041 is a 17th-century British music manuscript commonplace book. As described by musicologist John P. Cutts, Drexel 4041 "is a treasure-house of early seventeenth-century song and dramatic lyric worthy of the attention of any student of seventeenth-century literature and drama." It is also a major source for the work of English composer William Lawes. Belonging to the New York Public Library, it forms part of the Drexel Collection, housed in the Music Division of the New York Public Library for the Performing Arts. Following traditional library practice, its name is derived from its call number.

== Dating ==
Drexel 4041 dates from between 1640 and 1650. Royalist songs near the end of the manuscript point to its completion in the late 1640s For this reason Cutts suggests the date 1649 based on the songs' content.

== Physical description ==
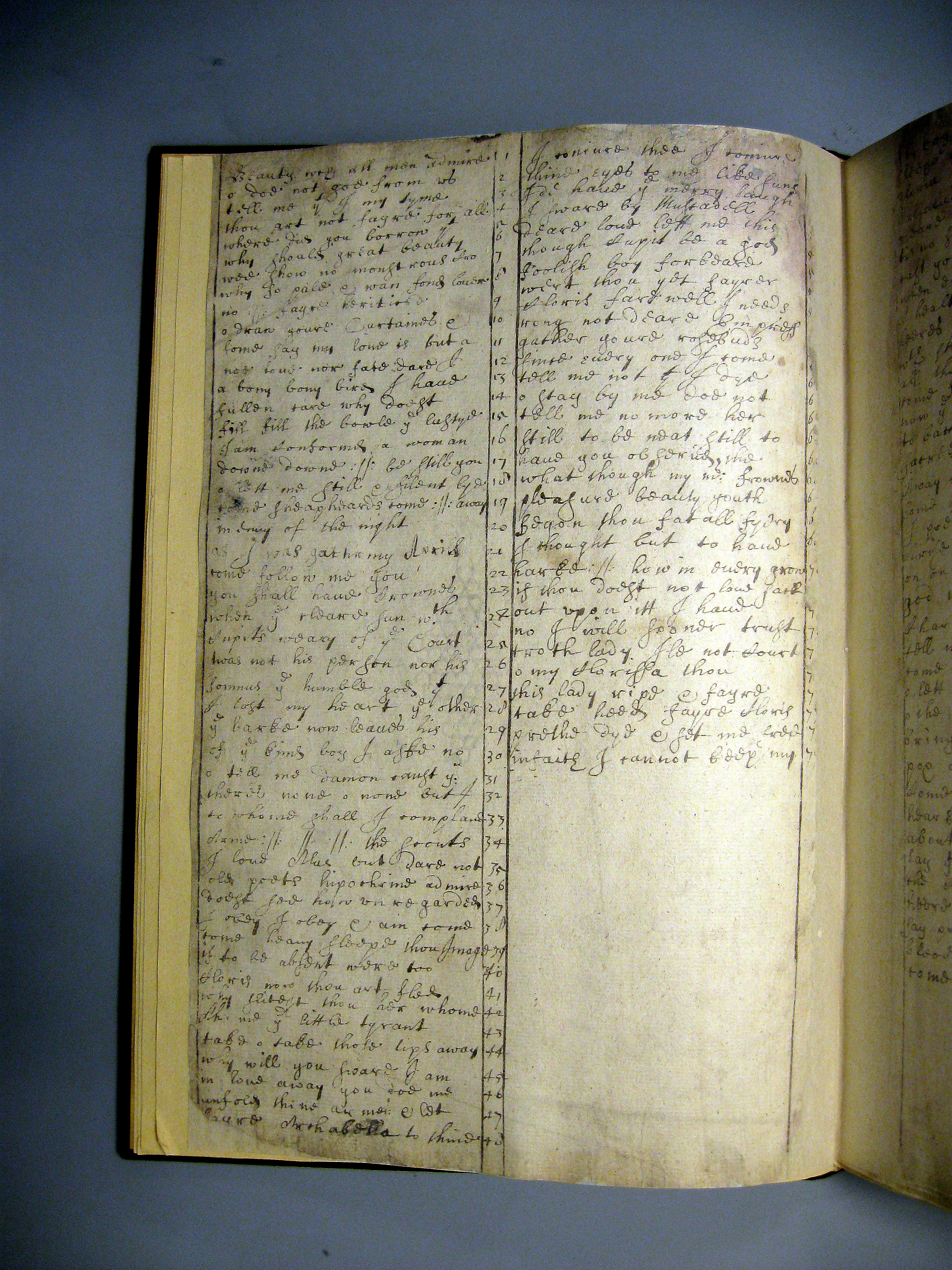
Folio 1 verso: The first table of contents

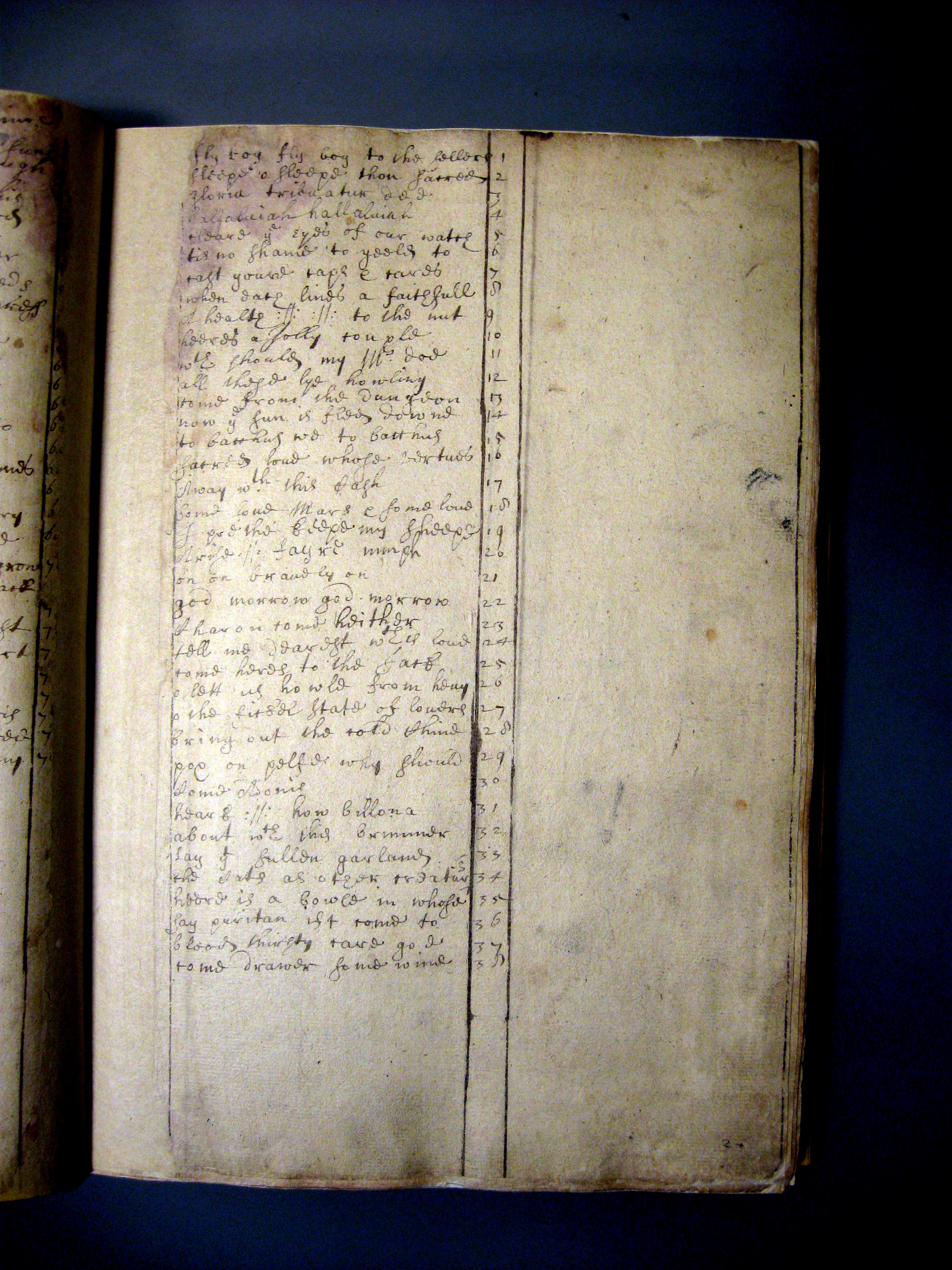
Folio 2 recto: The second table of contents

Drexel 4041 measures 11.5 by 7.5 inches (29 cm × 19 cm) and is composed of 144 folios, including two leaves for tables of contents. It lacks the introductory and concluding leaves typically found in similar manuscripts on which would indicate ownership by means of signatures or similar inscriptions.

One of the manuscript's idiosyncratic features are its two tables of contents, both incomplete. The first table of contents begins on folio 1 verso and is numbered 1-79, leaving the remainder of the page blank. No table is made for the next 20 songs. The second table of contents begins on folio 2 recto with the song "Fly boy, fly boy to the sellers" (numbered 100 below) and continues through number 38. Because of this peculiar numbering in the two tables of contents, Willa McClung Evans, a scholar who earlier studied the manuscript, surmised it might have been a conglomeration of several manuscripts "representing perhaps the tastes of three owners of the volume or of three periods in the life of a single owner." She considered the handwriting from several unidentified hands. Cutts believed the manuscript to be the work of a single owner.

Cutts questions why some songs are unnumbered. He surmises that, presumably, the scribe added songs after compiling the tables of contents without making additions to the table. He noted that, like British Library Add. 29481, Egerton Ms. 2013, and New York Public Library Drexel 4175, several manuscripts of this period have at least two series of contents.

In 1973 the manuscript underwent conservation by Carolyn Horton and Associates which included numbering the folios.

== Handwriting ==
The manuscript appears to be the work of a single scribe. It is not work of a professional copyist but of a secretarial hand, consistent in its use of italics. Based on the idiosyncratic natures of letters such as "e", "r" and "c," Cutts attributes an Italian influence to the scribe. An unusual attribute of this scribe is that he tends to write v for u, resulting in words such as "thov" (thou). The calligraphy is difficult due to many cross outs and obscuring of letters due to an unsharpened quill and smudging.

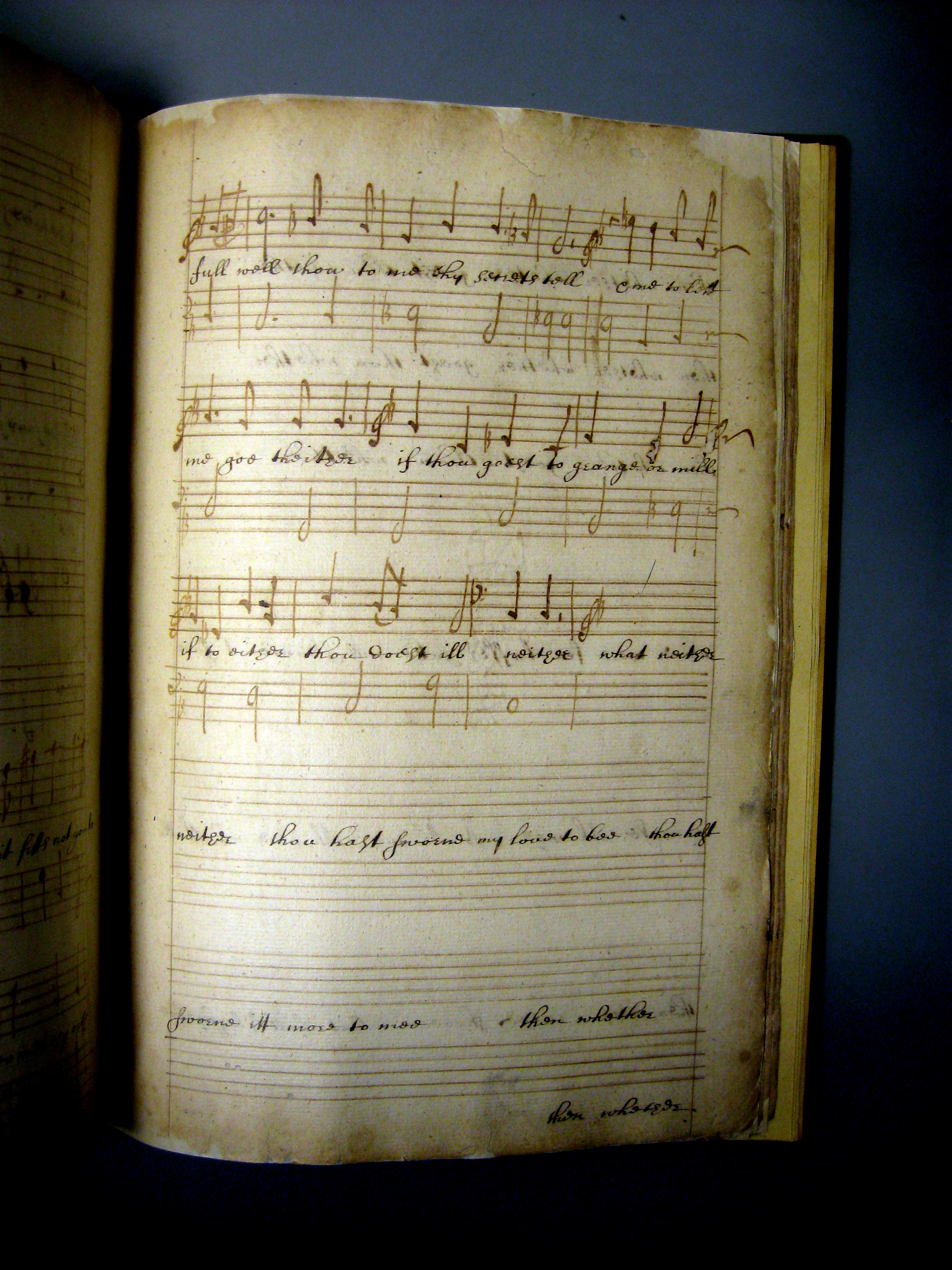
Folio 132 recto: the copyist has copied the lyrics but left the music incomplete

The contents were entered over a period time suggesting a commonplace book. Cutts discerns that scribe must have had access to other manuscripts circulating among court and theatrical musicians based on the variety of composer names associated with both spheres.

Most of the marginalia was added by its former owner Edward F. Rimbault.

== Provenance ==
Rimbault wrote that the earliest known owner of Drexel 4041 was Robert Shirley, 1st Earl Ferrers. The manuscript stayed within his family at their estate in Staunton Harold. Rimbault obtained it from the descendants for his own collection.

An organist and musicologist, Rimbault took a keen interest in English music and voraciously collected rare books, scores, and valuable manuscripts. Upon his death in 1876, his extensive and valuable library was auctioned by Sotheby's over the course of five days. The Sotheby catalogue entry for this manuscript reads:

Songs (A Collection of), by Dr. John Wilson, Henry and William Lawes, Dr. Charles Colman, Robert Johnson, Thomas Brewer, John Taylor, John Atkins, and other Composers of the 17th century, calf, folio.

The manuscript along with about 300 lots were purchased by Philadelphia-born financier Joseph W. Drexel, who had already amassed a large music library. Upon Drexel's death, he bequeathed his music library to The Lenox Library. When the Lenox Library merged with the Astor Library to become the New York Public Library, the Drexel Collection became the basis for one of its founding units, the Music Division. Today, Drexel 4041 is part of the Drexel Collection in the Music Division, now located at the New York Public Library for the Performing Arts at Lincoln Center.

== Attributions ==
Although a high proportion of songs have composer attributions (or abbreviations suggesting attributions), they are inconsistent and not always reliable. Already in 1856, Rimbault (at the time still in possession of the manuscript) identified the actor "Jack Wilson" as the composer of several songs "as is proved by a book of manuscript music, as old in some parts as the time of the English Civil War, although in others it seems to have been written in the reign of Charles II of England. That song is there found with Wilson's name at the end of it, as the author of the music: unluckily the manuscript says nothing regarding the authorship of the words..."

Cutts notes the attribution of "mr Eynes" to the song "Collin say why sitts thou soe." However, he recognizes the setting is that of Nicholas Lanier, as confirmed in three other contemporaneous manuscripts, and wonders how the scribe could have derived "Eynes" from "Lanier."

As an example of a typically puzzling situation, Jorgens takes the song "O tell mee damon canst thou proue." The initials on the song are W.L., suggesting William Lawes is the composer, a hypothesis that gains weight when considering the number of songs by him in the collection. She quotes Cutts who declares the setting is "the only extant version of William Lawes's setting," pointing out further that "Drexel 4257, 161 contains William Webb's setting and it was Webb's that was published in Select Musicall Ayres and Dialogues, 1652, 1I.32 and 1653. Unfortunately Cutts is wrong; the setting in Drexel 4257 is the same as in Drexel 4041; so is the composer Lawes, or Webb?" Jorgens concludes that only with the availability of many manuscript facsimiles and early printed editions can correct composer attributions be made.

According to Lefkowitz, it is only through collation of Drexel 4041 with other allied manuscripts (such as Drexel 4257, British Library Add. 31432, as well as the manuscripts in the Bodleian Library) that attributions and correct musical texts can be determined.

== Content ==
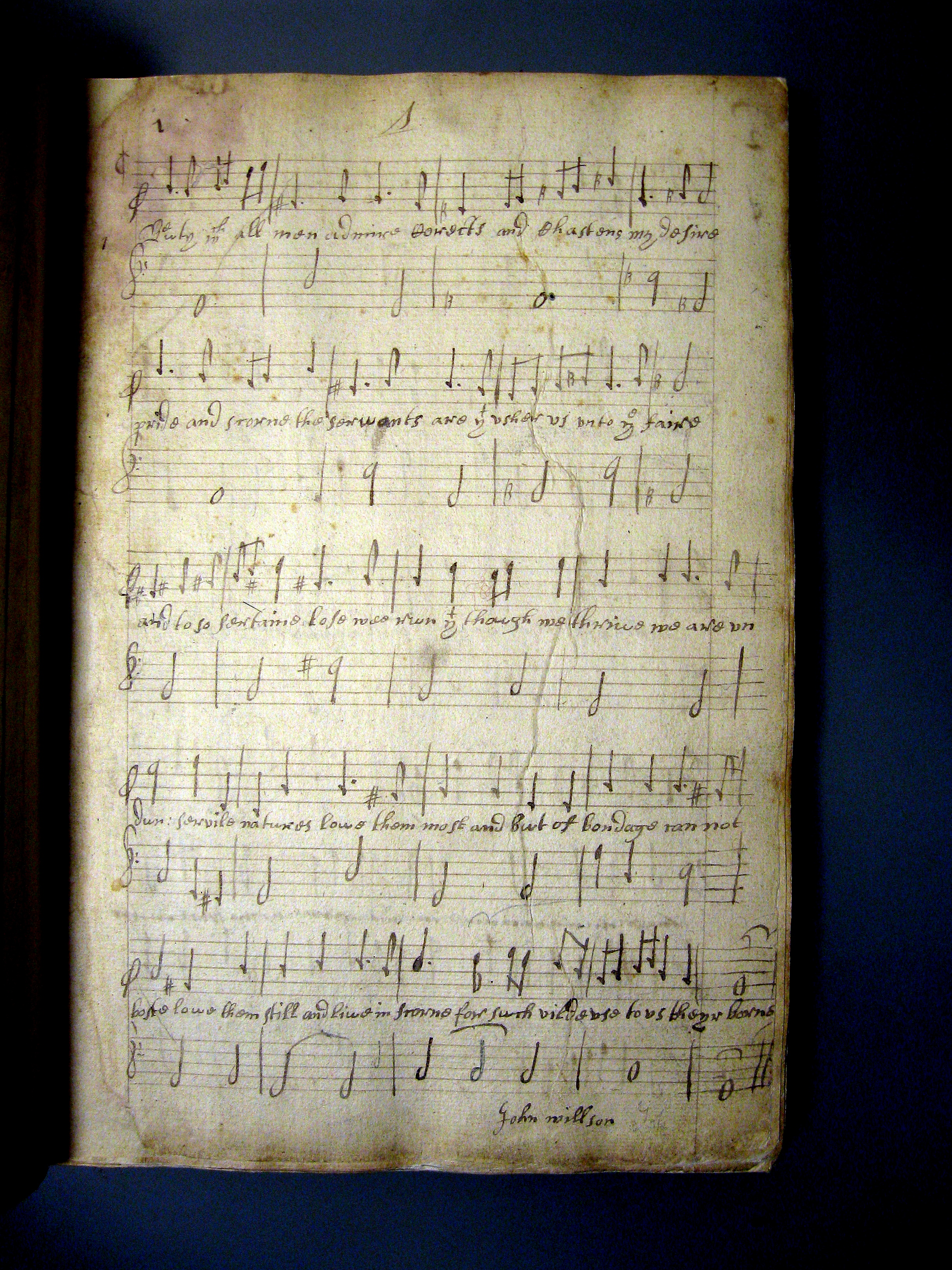
Folio 3 recto containing the song "Beauty which all men admire"

The contents of the manuscript suggest the owner liked the theatre, as there are lyrics to at least 30 plays. The collection is unusual in that most of the texts can be identified. Cutts surmises that these compilations of music manuscripts, while giving the impression of commonplace books, also suggest that the music and poetry of theatre musicians were circulated among each other, influencing their compositional development.

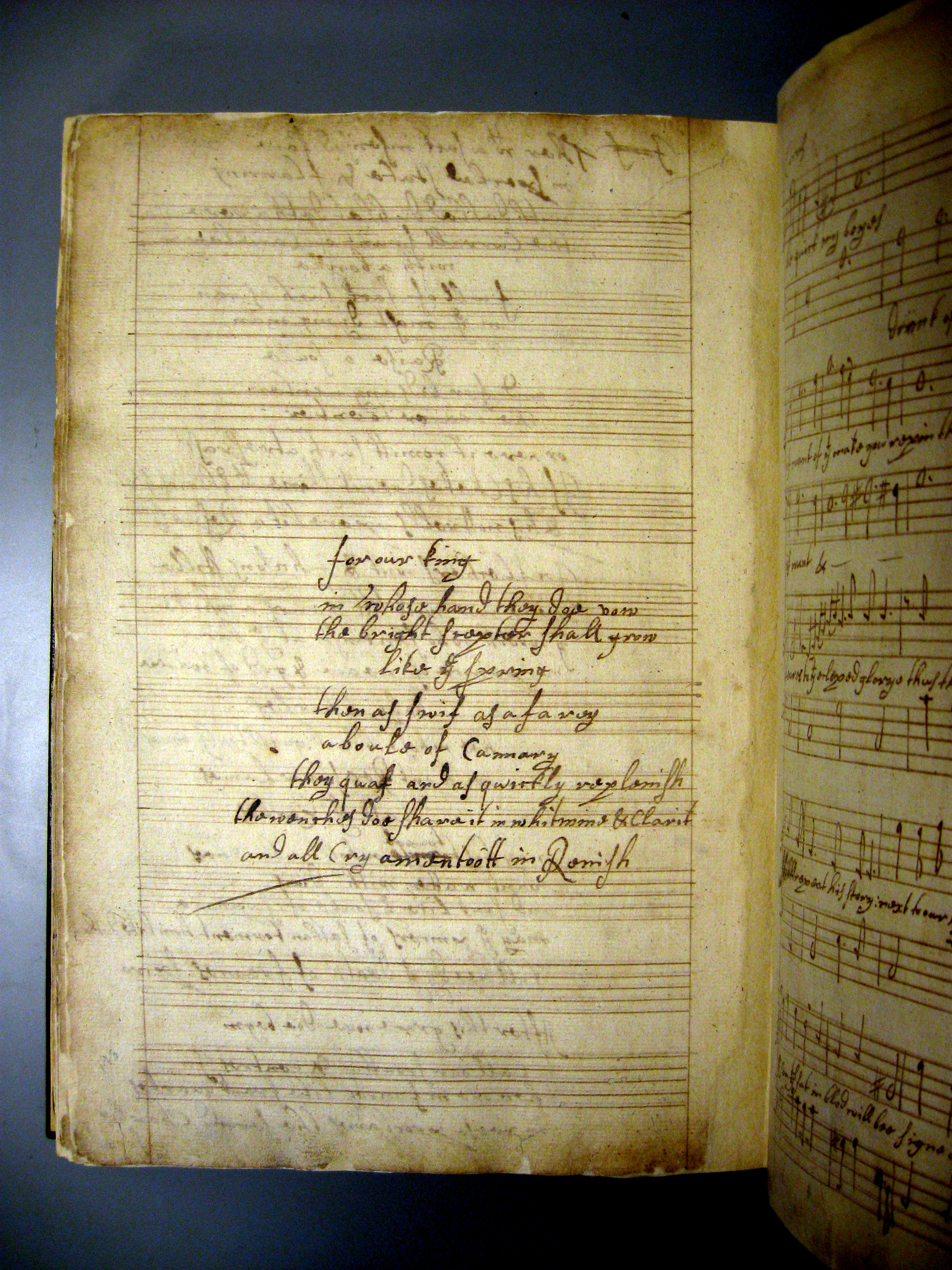
Folio 143 verso - the lyrics provide evidence of royalist sympathies

Evans remarks upon the song "Why soe pall and wan fond louer" and notes that it was probably written and known prior to its appearance in John Suckling's play Aglaura, based on the character Orsames's comments to it: "I little foolish counsel, Madame, I gave / a Friend of mine four or fives years ago / When he was falling into a consumption." Evans notes that the song was easy to perform, so that it could be sung by regular members of the acting company (rather than a professional singer). L.A. Beaurline states that this setting of "Why So Pale and Wan" is the earliest existing musical setting of this lyric.

Cutts remarks that "it is virtually impossible to be certain that particular songs are not actually separate songs but sections of others." Clearly some songs gave Cutts trouble; where he saw two songs beginning at folio 89 verso ("Come from the dungeon to the throne" followed by "Thou O bright sun"), Jorgens renders these as a single song.

Musicologist Vincent J. Duckles notes the first song, "Beauty which all men admire" must have had some currency as it is found in two other contemporaneous manuscripts. He calls it a "tour de force" of harmonic experimentation work, showing the early Baroque range of harmonic freedom to an extent rarely found in English music.

The song "Oh let us howl" from John Webster's play The Duchess of Malfi has received attention. An unnamed reviewer commented that it is the only source that provides a satisfactory thorough bass for the work. Duckles finds it "particularly interesting because it is written for a tenor voice, joined by the bass in a 2-part chorus in the last section "At last when as our quire wants breath . . . ", an arrangement which may well have been the one employed in the original production of the play. Furthermore, it bears a contemporary attribution to Robert Johnson as the composer. What Mr. Cutts has been able to conjecture on stylistic grounds is thus confirmed by solid documentary evidence."

Cutts regarded the marginal note on 124v "he/my/King/too" as evidence that the compiler was royalist in sympathy and identified himself with the song's denunciation of the adversaries of King Charles I of England. This evidence led Cutts to believe the collection was assembled prior to the execution of Charles I in 1649.

Evans notes that the text of "A Loose Sarabande" by Richard Lovelace offers textual variants.

== List of contents ==
Many of the text attributions and other remarks are from Cutts (1964) and RISM.

Number	Folios	Title	Composer	Lyricist	Remarks
1	3r	Beuty wch all men admire	John Wilson		
2	3v-4r	0 doe nott goe from us and bringe	John Wilson		
3	4r	Tell me nott I my time Misspend	John Wilson	John Dryden? Philip King?	attributed to either John Eaton, John Dryden or Philip King
4	5r-5v	Thou artt nott faire for all thy red and whight	Nicholas Lanier	Thomas Campion	Setting of Thomas Campion's Song XII in his Booke of Ayres, 1601
5	6r	Wher[e] did you borrow that last sigh	William Lawes	William Berkeley	from The Lost Lady (1637)
6	6r-6v	Why should greatt bewty uertuous fame desier	William Lawes	William Davenant	
7	6v-7v	Wee show noe monsstrous crockadell	William Lawes	Jasper Mayne	from The City Match (1637)
8	7v-8v	Why soe pall and wan fond louer	William Lawes	John Suckling	from Aglaura (1637)
9	8v-9r	Noe [noe] faire heriticke	Henry Lawes	John Suckling	from Aglaura (1637); possibly composed by William Lawes; published in Select Musicall Ayres and Dialogues (1652); Select Ayres and Dialogues (1659); The Treasury of Musick (1669)
10	9r-9v	0 draw your curtaines and appeare	William Lawes	William Davenant	from the play Love and Honour (1634)
11	10r	Som say my loue is butt a man	John Wilson	Richard Brome	Text from The Northern Lass (1629)
12	10v-11r	Nor loue nor fate dare I acuse	John Wilson	Richard Brome	Text from The Northern Lass (1629)
13	11r-11v	A bony [bony] bird I haue	John Wilson	Richard Brome	Text from The Northern Lass (1629)
14	12r	Sullen care why dost thou keepe	William Lawes		
15	12v-13r	Fill fill ye bowele ye lusty wyne will dye	William Lawes		For two voices
16	13r-13v	I am confermd a woman can	Henry Lawes	John Suckling	
17	13v-14r	Downe [downe downe] be still you seas	John Wilson		Published in Wilson's Cheerful Ayres (1659-1660), without attribution
18	14v-15v	0 let mee still and silentt lye	William Lawes		
19	15v-16r	Com shepherds com, Com away with out delay	William Lawes?	John Fletcher	from The Faithful Shepherdess (1607)
20	16r	In enuye of the night	William Lawes	James Shirley	from The Triumph of Peace (1634)
21	16v	As I was gathering aprill flowers	John Wilson	Richard Brome	Text from The Northern Lass (1629)
22	17r	Com follow me you cuntry Lasses		John Fletcher	from Fletcher's The Maid in the Mill (1623)
23	17v	You shall have crownes of roses dayses	John Gamble?	John Fletcher	Text from The Maid in the Mill (1623)
24	17v-18r	When ye deer sun with his beames hott	John Wilson		Treble only
25	18v	Cupids wearie of the court	William Lawes		Published in New Ayres and Dialogues (1678)
26	19r	Twas not his parson nor his partes			
27	19v-20r	Somnus the vmble God that dwles in cottages	William Lawes?	John Denham	from The Sophy (1641)
28	20v-21r	I lost my hart ye other day	John Wilson		
29	21v-22r	The larke now leaues his wattry nest	William Lawes	William Davenant	Two voices; published in Wilson's Cheerful Ayres (1659-1660)
30	22v-23r	Of thee kind boy I aske noe red and whight	Nicholas Lanier	John Suckling	[added in later hand; alternative setting on following page, without full text, attributed by Cutts to William Webb; see Cutts in Bibliography]; Text published in John Suckling's Fragmenta Aurea (1646) as Sonnet II
31	23v-24r	O tell mee damon canst thou proue	William Lawes?		
32	24r-24v	There is none o none but I	John Wilson	Robert Aytoun	Setting of Ayton's "To a Scornful Mistresse"
33	24v	To whome shall I complained to men or gods	William Lawes		Published in New Ayres and Dialogues (1678)
34	25r-26v	Arm [arm arm arm] ye scuts are all com in	Robert Johnson	John Fletcher	Text from Fletcher's The Mad Lover (1617)
35	26v-27r	I loue alas but daire not show it	John Wilson		Published in Select Musicall Ayres and Dialogues (1652) and Wilson's Cheerful Ayres (1659-1660)
36	27r-27v	Ould poetes hippocrin admirer	Henry Lawes	Thomas Randolph	Treble only; Text attributed to "N.N." by Lawes in his Ayres and Dialogues (1655) and to Thomas Randolph in Wit and Mirth (1684)
37	27v-28r	Dost see how vnregarded now	John Atkins?	John Suckling	Sonnet by John Suckling
38	28v-29v	I obay I obay and am com to vew ye day	Thomas Holmes?	John Fletcher	“T H” added in later hand and might refer to Thomas Holmes; from John Fletcher's The Humorous Lieutenant (1619)
39	29v-30r	Com heavie sepe [=sleep] thov image of trve deth	Robert Johnson?	John Lyly?	Text possibly by John Lyly
40	30v-31r	If to be absent were to bee away from thee	H L [Henry Lawes]	Richard Lovelace	“H L” added in later hand
41	31r-31v	Cloris now thou art fled away	H L [Henry Lawes]	Henry Hughes	Attributed to Hughes in Lawes's Ayres (1658) and his Select Ayres and Dialogues (1669)
42	31v-32v	Why slightst thov her whome I aprove	John Atkins?	Benjamin Rudyerd	Text ascribed to Rudyerd in Pembroke and Rudyard's Poems (1660)
43	33r-33v	Aye me ye little Tyrant Theife	Henry Lawes	[Richard Lovelace]	“A loose Saraband-Lovelace poems 12ms 1649 p. 26” – added in Rimbault's hand
44	34r	Take O take those lips away	John Wilson	Francis Beaumont & John Fletcher	From "The Tragedy of the Bloody Brother" [added in later hand], i.e. Rollo Duke of Normandy
45	34v	Why will you sware I am forsworne	Thomas Charles	Richard Lovelace	"Poems 12m 1649 p. 15" added in later hand
46	35r	In loue away you doe me wrong	John Atkins?	Henry Hughes	Treble only
47	35v	Vnfold thine armes & let me goe	Henry Lawes]		
48	36r-36v	Faire Archibella to thine eyes	John Taylor	Inigo Jones	
49	36v-37r	I coniure the [=thee] I coniure the, by the skin that is so faire	J w [John Wilson?]	William Cavendish of Newcastle	Text from William Cavendish's play "The Varietie" (1639)
50	37v	Thine eyes to mee like sonnes appeare	John Wilson	William Cavendish, 1st Duke of Newcastle	Text from Cavendish's play The Varietie (1639); published in Cheerful Ayres
51	38r-38v	Ide [=I’d] haue the [=thee] merry laugh and smile	John Wilson	William Cavendish, 1st Duke of Newcastle	Text from Cavendish's play The Varietie (1639); published in Cheerful Ayres
52	38v-39r	I sawre by muscadell that I doe loue the well	[John Wilson]	William Cavendish, 1st Duke of Newcastle	Text from Cavendish's play The Varietie (1639); published in Cheerful Ayres
53	39r-40r	Deare loue let mee this euening die		William Davenant	From Davenant's "The Dying Lover"; treble only; incorrectly numbered 54 in right margin
54	40r	Though cupit be a god alas hese but a boy	Henry Lawes		
55	40v-41r	Foolish boy forbeare & flee			Treble only
56	41v-42r	Wert thou yet fairer then thou art	John Atkins?	Thomas Stanley	
57	42r	Cloris farewell I needs must goe	Henry Lawes		
58	42v	Rong [=wrong] not deare Empresse of my hart			Treble only; another copy on 46r; see no. 65
59	43r	Gather your Rosebuds whilst you may	William Lawes	Robert Herrick	Text from Robert Herrick's "Hesperides" (1648); published in New Ayres and Dialogues (1678)
60	43r-43v	Since euery wone [=one] I come among	Henry Lawes	Benjamin Rudyerd	Treble only
61	44r	Tell me not ye I dye or lieu by thee	John Taylor	John Tatham	Text from Ostella (1650)
62	44v-45r	Oh stay by me doe not fly me			
63	45r	Tell me no more her eyes ar like towe rising sunns	William Lawes		Published in Select Musicall Ayres and Dialogues (1652); Select Ayres and Dialogues (1659); and The Treasury of Musick (1669)
64	45v	Still to be neat still to be drest	[William Lawes]	Ben Jonson	Text from Ben Jonson's Epicœne, or The silent woman (1609); inscription "Ben Jonson" added in later hand;
65	46r	Wrong not deere Empress of my hart			Text has been attributed to Walter Raleigh, Robert Aytoun, and the Earl of Pembroke; with bass line; another copy on 42v; see no. 58
66	46v-47r	Haue you obserud ye hermit when he runs	John Gamble		Published in Ayres and Dialogues (1659)
67	47r-47v	What though my Mris frowne one [=on] me			
68	48r	Pleasure bewty youth attend ye	William Lawes	John Ford	from The Lady's Trial; Wrongly attributed to Henry Lawes in Select Ayres and Dialogues (1669)
69	48v-49v	Begon thou fatall fiery feauer			
70	49v-50r	I thought but to haue warmd me at thine eyes	John Taylor?	Inigo Jones	
71	50v-51r	If thou doest not loue sacke, & drinke whilst thou canst see	Henry Lawes?		
72	51r-51v	Out upon itt I have loued	Henry Lawes	John Suckling	Treble only; authorial attribution added in later hand: At head of 1st system, f.51r: "Sir John Suckling ad: 1772" - p. 53
73	52r	Harke Harke how in euery groe	William Lawes?	James Shirley	Text from Cupid's Call (1646)
-	52v				Page is blank
74	53r-53v	No I will sooner rust the winds	Charles Coleman	Thomas Stanley	
75	53v-54r	Troth ladye Ile not court			Text only; incomplete
-	54v				Page is blank
76	55r-55v	O my Clorissa thou crewel fayre	William Lawes		Published in "Select ayres and dialogues"
77	56r-56v	This lady ripe & fayre & fresh as eastern summers are	John Atkins	William Davenant	
78	56v-57v	Take heede fayre Chloris how you tame		Henry Hughes	
79	57v-58r	Prethe dye & set me free		John Denham	Bass line incomplete
80	58r-59r	In faith I Cannot kepe my shepe sense first I grew to bee in love			Treble only
81	59r-59v	Youre loue if virtuous will shew forth	Henry Lawes		
82	60v-61r	When the chill cherocco blowes and winter tells a heauy tale	John Atkins	Thomas Bonham	
-	61v-62r				Pages are blank
83	62v	Noe twas hir eyes starrs haue noe influence	Henry Lawes		
84	63r	Did I once say ye thou wert fayre	Henry Lawes	Henry Hughes	Published in Ayres and Dialogues (1658)
85	63v-64v	Come com thou glorious object of my sight	Henry Lawes	Thomas Killigrew	Text from Thomas Killegrew's Selindra; Published in Ayres and Dialogues (1653) and Select Ayres and Dialogues (1669)
86	65r	Sweete Serena skylike flower	John Wilson	Richard Lovelace	"The Rose, Lovelace poems 12m 1649 page 11" [added in later hand]; 3rd verse is at the foot of 64v
87	65v	Com cloris high wee too ye bower	Henry Lawes	Henry Reynolds	
88	66r-66v	Tell me you wandering spirits of the Ayre	Henry Lawes		Published in Select Musicall Ayres and Dialogues (1652, 1653, 1659, 1669)
89	67r-67v	Great Julius was a Cuckold			Text only
90	67v-68r	Full fadam fiue thy father lyes		William Shakespeare	Text only
91	68v-69r	Bewty and loue once fell att odds	Henry Lawes		Published in Select Ayres and Dialogues (1652)
92	69v	How coole and temprate I am growne	Henry Lawes		
-	70r				Page is blank
93	70v-71v	Thov dreges of lethey O thov dull			Included in Cleveland Revived (1660)
94	71v	Tis now since I sate downe before	John Atkins	John Suckling	Nearly illegible ascription of text to Suckling, 1772, p. 30
95	72v-73r	Change Platonnicks Change for shame			Another copy on 139r; see no. 145
96	73v-74v	Swift through ye yielding are I glide	Hennery Lawes		Published in Select Ayres and Dialogues (1669)
97	74v	Alas poore Cupitt art thou blind			Text only
98	75r-76r	Wrong me more in thy complaint			Text only
99	76r-77v	Close by a fringed banck I found	John willson		
100	78r	Fly boy fly boy to the sellers bottome	Simon Ives?		Published in Select Ayres and Dialogues (1659)
101	78v-79r	Sleepe O sleepe thou Sacrd dust	John Taylor?		Dialogue; Composer identified as John Taylor by Cutts (1964)
102	80r	Gloria tribuatur deo	Thomas Brewer		Latin text; trio with figured bass on facing page
103	80v	Hallaluia hallaluia	Richard Dering		Another ascription crossed out; for two voice and two instruments
104	81r-82v	Cleare the eyes of our watch	Martin Llewellyn		With chorus for three voices; (continued on 82r with “Now no more will wee harke to the charmes”
105	82v-83v	Tis noe shame to yield to beauty	William Lawes		With chorus for three voices
106	84r-85r	Cast youre caps and cares away	John Wilson	John Fletcher	Text from Beggar's Bush (1622); For two voices without accompaniment
107	85r-86r	When each lynes a faithfull drinker	William Lawes		For three voices
108	86v-87v	A Health a health a health to the nut browne lasse	William Lawes	John Suckling	from The Goblins (1636); dialogue with chorus for three voices
109	87v-88r	Heres a Jolly couple	William Lawes?		Lacking bass for verse
110	88v-89r	What should my mistresse doe with haire	William Lawes	James Shirley	from The Duke's Mistress (1638); With chorus for two voices
111	89r	All these lye howling	William Lawes?	[John Fletcher]	For two voices without accompaniment; from The Mad Lover (revived 1630)
112	89v-92r	Come from the dungeon to the throne	Henry Lawes	William Cartwright	For varied combinations, one to five voices; in ten sections which Cutts, following Evans, divides as two separate entries, the second beginning at "Thou O bright sun." Each stanza is sung by a different voice (1st stanza tenor, 2nd stanza treble, and 3rd and 4th stanzas for bass), answered by a 5-part chorus.
113	92v-94v	Now the sn is fled downe to leths bed	Henry Lawes?	William Cartwright	from The Royal Slave (1636); dialogue in eight sections with chorus; attributed elsewhere to William Lawes
114	95r-96r	To bacchus wee to bacchus sing with wine and mirth	"C C"	Thomas Killigrew	Attribution barely legible; identified by Cutts are Charles Coleman; with chorus for three voices
115	96v-97r	Sacred loue whose virtues power	William Lawes?		Dialogue
116	97r-98r	Away with this cash twill make us all mad	John Atkins		Dialogue with chorus
117	98r-98v	Some loue Marce [=Mars] and some loue Venus	Henry Lawes?		Dialogue with chorus
118	99r-100r	I preethee keepe my sheepe for mee	Nicholas Lanier		Dialogue; Published as a composition of Nicholas Lanier in Select Musicall Ayres and Dialogues (1652)
119	100r-100v	Arise Arise fayre nymph arise			Dialogue; incomplete at end
120	101r-101v	On brauely on the foe is meet	Thomas Nabbes		With chorus for three voices
121	102r-103r	God morrow god morrow unto her	William Lawes	James Shirley	Dialogue with chorus;
122	103r-105r	Charon come heither Charon	John Wilson		Ascribed elsewhere to John Hiton; dialogue with chorus
123	105v	Tell mee dearest what is loue		Francis Beaumont	from The Knight of the Burning Pestle (1607) dialogue with chorus
124	106r-107r	Come heres to ye jack tis A cup of old sacke	Henry Lawes?		Treble only
125	107v-108r	Oh lett us howle som heauie noat	Robert Johnson		From The Duchess of Malfi (1613); with chorus for two voices without accompaniment
126	108r-109r	Oh the fickle state off Louers		Francis Quarles	Text only; Music attributed to William Lawes, though in some sources also attributed to Henry Lawes
127	109r-111r	Bringe outt ye could chine	John Wilson		With chorus for 3 voices
128	111v	Pox on pelfe why should wee loue it	John Taylor		
129	112r-113r	Come Adonis come again	Henry Lawes?	John Tatham	Attributed to William Lawes in Select Ayres and Dialogues (1659); The Treasury of Musick (1669); New Ayres and Dialogues, (1678); with chorus for two voices;
130	113r-114r	Hark hark how billona thunder’s	Henry Lawes		For two or three voices without accompaniment
-	114v				Page is blank
131	115r-115v	About with this brimmer my bullyes			Dialogue with chorus
-	116r				Page is blank
132	116v-117r	Lay yt sullen garland by thee	John Taylor		With unaccompanied chorus for two voices
-	117v				Page is blank
133	118r-119r	The Catts as other creates doe	William Lawes		With chorus for two voices
134	119v-120r	Heere is a boule in whose wide coasts	John Atkins		With chorus for three voices
-	120v				Page is blank
135	121r-122v	Say puritan ist come to passé by I know not who			Bass incomplete; chorus for two voices
136	122v-124r	Blood thirsty care goe packe			With chorus for two voices
137	124v-125r	Come drawer some wine or wele pull downe your signe			Included in Thomas Weaver's "Love and Drollery" (1654), "Rump" (1662), and "Loyal Garland" (1686); for two voices without accompaniment
138	125v-126r	Hast your nymphes makehast away	John willson		Dialogue with chorus for two voices
139	126v-127v	You that delight in concord liston			For three voices; incomplete
-	128r-130r				Pages are blank
140	130v-131r	Collin say why sitts thow soe	"Mr Eyves" (Simon Ives?)		The attribution of this song to a Mr. Eyves has been questioned, as it is attributed to Nicholas Lanier in at least three other sources
141	131v-133v	Gett you hence for I must goe where it fitts not you to know			Dialogue; setting incomplete: music missing after measure 19
142	133v	There can bee noe glad man compared to the mad man			Incomplete; another copy of no. 144 on f. 137v; Text published in "Wit and Mirth" (1701)
-	134r				Page is blank
143	134v-137r	Vp vp and be gon thou wanton heate	Henry Lawes		Dialogue with chorus for two voices
144	137v-138v	There can bee noe glad man	Will Lawes		With chorus for three voices; see no. 142, folio 133v
145	139r-139v	Change platonikts change for sham			For two voices without accompaniment; see no. 95 on f. 72v; Published in Select Ayres and Dialogues (1653, 1659); The Treasury of Musick (1669)
146	139v-140v	To ye hall for Justc [=Justice] wee call	Yo. Yorkney	Alexander Brome	For two voices without accompaniment; The inscription "Yo. Yorkney" may refer to John Yowckney; Cutts identified the composer as Alexander Brome
147	141r-141v	A pox o those od mates	John Atkinson [i.e. Atkins?]	Henry Bold	With chorus for two voices
148	142r-143v	Joyne thy inameld Checke to myne	John Pamball [John Gamble?]	Thomas Jordan	With chorus for two voices
149	144r	Be quick my boyes : Coras [=chorus]	John Atkins		Chorus for two voices
-	144v				Page is blank

== See also ==
- Drexel 4257
- Edward F. Rimbault

== Bibliography ==
=== Facsimile ===
Drexel 4041. Vol. 9 of English song, 1600-1675: Facsimiles of Twenty-Six Manuscripts and an Edition of the Texts, ed. with introductions by Elise Bickford Jorgens. New York: Garland, 1987.

=== Works cited ===
- Beaurline, L.A. (Winter 1963), ""Why So Pale and Wan": An Essay in Critical Method", Texas Studies in Literature and Language, 4 (4): 553–563
- Catalogue of the valuable library of the late Edward Francis Rimbault, comprising an extensive and rare collection of ancient music, printed and in manuscript...which will be sold by auction, by Messrs. Sotheby, Wilkinson & Hodge ... on Tuesday, the 31st of July, 1877, and five following days, London: Sotheby, Wilkinson & Hodge, 1877
- Charteris, Richard (2008), "Correspondence", Music and Letters, 89 (4): 698–700, doi:10.1093/ml/gcn093
- Cutts, John P. (1964), "Drexel Manuscript 4041", Musica Disciplina: 151–202
- Cutts, John P. (1955), "Robert Johnson: King's Musician in His Majesty's Public Entertainment", Music and Letters (2): 110–25, doi:10.1093/ml/XXXVI.2.110
- Duckles, Vincent (1954), "The "Curious" Art of John Wilson (1595-1674): An Introduction to His Songs and Lute Music", Journal of the American Musicological Society, 7 (2): 93–112, doi:10.1525/jams.1954.7.2.03a00010
- Duckles, Vincent (1953), "Jacobean Theatre Songs", Music & Letters, 34 (1): 98–99, doi:10.1093/ml/xxxiv.1.88
- Evans, Willa McClung (1941), Henry Lawes, Musician and Friend of Poets, New York: Modern Language Association of America
- Evans, Willa McClung (1939), "Lawes and Lovelace's Loose Saraband", Publications of the Modern Language Association, 54 (3): 764–67, doi:10.2307/458482, JSTOR 458482
- Evans, Willa McClung (1946), "The Rose: A Song by Wilson and Lovelace", Modern Language Quarterly, 7 (3): 269–78, doi:10.1215/00267929-7-3-269
- Henze, Catherine A. (2000), "How Music Matters: Some Songs of Robert Johnson in the Plays of Beaumont and Fletcher", Comparative Drama, 34 (1): 1–32, doi:10.1353/cdr.2000.0026
- Jorgens, Elise Bickford (1987), New York Public Library manuscripts, English song, 1600-1675: Facsimiles of Twenty-Six Manuscripts and an Edition of the Texts, vol. 9, New York: Garland, ISBN 9780824082390
- Lefkowitz, Murray (1960), William Lawes, London: Routledge and Kegan Paul
- Rimbault, Edward F. (1856), Who Was "Jack Wilson," The Singer of Shakespeare's Stage?, London: John Russell Smith

=== Additional works ===
- Collier, John Payne. "John Wilson, the singer. ... " The Shakespeare Society's Papers (1845), p. 33-36.
- Cutts, John P. "A John Payne Collier Unfabricated 'Fabrication'." Notes and Queries (March 1959), p. 104-06.
- Cutts, John P. "An Unpublished Contemporary Setting of a Shakespeare Song." Shakespeare Survey (1956), p. 86-89.
- Cutts, John P. La Musique de Scene de la Troupe de Shakespeare. Paris: Éditions du Centre National de la Recherche Scientifique, 1959.
- Cutts, John P. "Music and 'The Mad Lover." Studies in the Renaissance (1961), p. 236-48.
- Cutts, John P. "'Songs vnto the lute and violl'." Musica Disciplina (1961), xv.
- Cutts, John P. "Thomas Heywood's 'The gentry to the King's Head' in 'The Rape of Lucrece and John Wilson's setting." Notes and Queries (October 1961), p. 384-87.
- Cutts, John P. "Thomas Nabbes's Hannibal and Scipio." English Miscellany (1963), p. 73-81.
- Cutts, John P. "Two Jacobean Theatre Songs." Music and Letters (October 1952), p. 333-34.
- Cutts, John P. "William Lawes's Writing for the Theatre and the Court." The Library (December 1952), p. 225-34.
- Day, Cyrus L. and Eleanor B. Murrie. English Song Books, 1651-1702. Oxford, 1940.
- Duckles, Vincent. "The Music for the Lyrics in Early Seventeenth-Century Drama: A Bibliography of Primary Sources," in Music in English Renaissance Drama, ed. John H. Long. Lexington, 1968. p. 117-60.
- Evans, Willa McClung. "The Rose: A Song by Wilson and Lovelace." Modern Language Quarterly (September 1946), p. 269-78.
- Evans, Willa McClung. "Lovelace's Concept of Prison Life in The Vintage to the Dungeon." Philological Quarterly (January 1947), p. 62-68.
- Evans, Willa McClung. "Hobson Appears in Comic Song." Philological Quarterly (October 1947), p. 321-27.
- Evans, Willa McClung, Lefkowitz, Murray. William Lawes. London, 1960.
