= John Gamble (musician) =

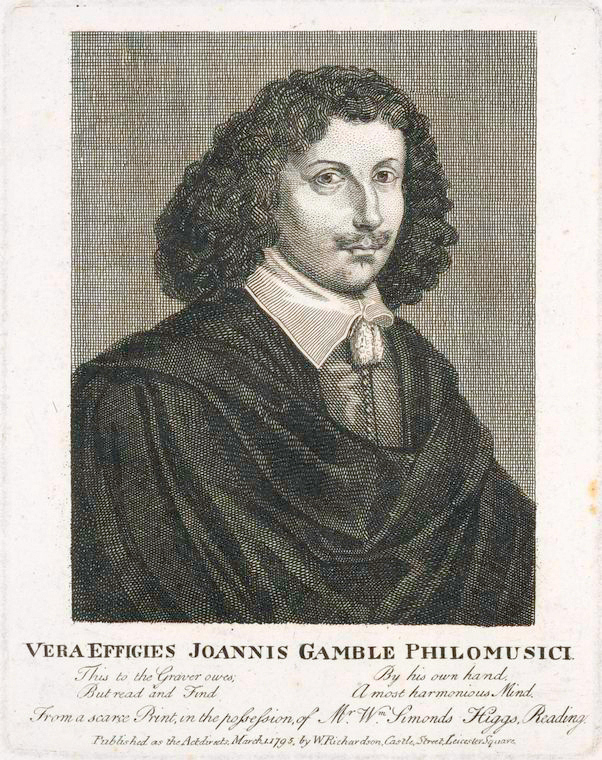
John Gamble, as published in 1795 by W. Richardson, London

John Gamble (died 1687) was a composer and musician in the court of Charles I of England and Charles II of England. He worked in the King's Company on the stage prior to the English Civil War, and in 1641 he was hired by the Middle Temple. During the Interregnum, he taught music and performed, and 1661 he got a position in the King's wind band playing cornett. He lost all of his money in the Great Fire of London in 1666 (as money would have been in coin and stored in homes, therefore liable to melting). In 1674 and 1676, he got positions in two more royal bands, but he lost all of his positions with the rise of James II of England, and he died "crazed and infirm of body" (according to his will) in 1687.

Gamble's main historical interest is for the two-book Ayres and Dialogues of 1656, 1657, and 1659. A third volume was projected and found in manuscript. The "dialogues" are dialogue songs—songs for two voices. The "airs" are solo songs. According to Anthony à Wood, the college at Oxford University were very impressed with his book. Even more importantly, Gamble assembled a commonplace book known as Drexel 4257 or by the inscription on the first page, "John Gamble his booke amen 1659" (in the Drexel Collection of the New York Public Library for the Performing Arts). It has 240 completely scored songs, mostly airs, representing the works of Henry Lawes, William Lawes, John Wilson, and John Gamble himself (28 songs), among others. The book was probably compiled, as the flyleaf note says, in 1659 ("anent" for "ament" and an his genitive for "Gamble's").

== See also ==
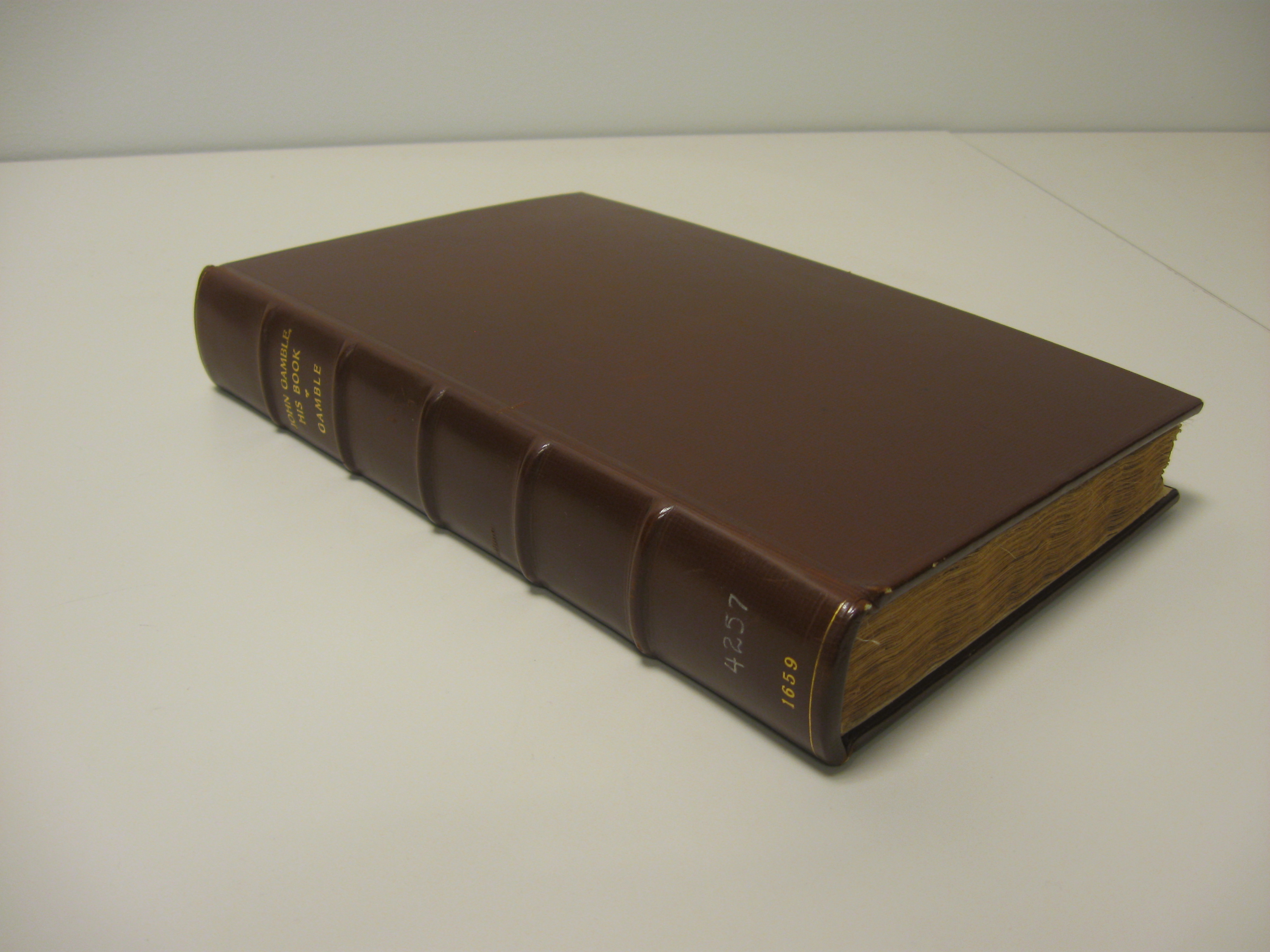
Drexel 4257, also known as "John Gamble his booke," a music manuscript in the New York Public Library

- Drexel 4257
