= Thomas Brewer (composer) =

Thomas Brewer (1611–c. 1660) was a 17th-century composer best known for introducing the glee form. Little is known of his life. However many of his compositions have survived. Most of them are catches, rounds and glees but three instrumental pieces are stored in the Oxford Music School collection.

== Life ==
A celebrated performer on the viol, he was born (probably) in the parish of Christchurch, Newgate Street in London. His father, Thomas Brewer, was a poulterer, and his mother's Christian name was True. On 9 December 1614 Brewer was admitted to Christ's Hospital, although he was only three years old. Here he remained until 20 June 1626, when he left school, and was apprenticed to one Thomas Warner. He learnt the viol at Christ's Hospital from the school music-master. The date of Brewer's death is unknown.

== Works ==
His compositions are met with in most of the printed collections of John Playford and John Hilton, published in the middle of the seventeenth century; nothing is known as to his biography. His printed works consist chiefly of rounds, catches, and part-songs, but in the Music School Collection at Oxford are preserved three instrumental pieces, consisting of airs, pavans, corrantos, &c., for which kind of composition he seems to have been noted. Two pieces by him are in Elizabeth Rogers's Virginal Book.

Brewer also composed 6 fantasias for 4 part viol consort and a set of four part instrumental dances.
