= William Lawes =

English composer and musician (1602–1645)

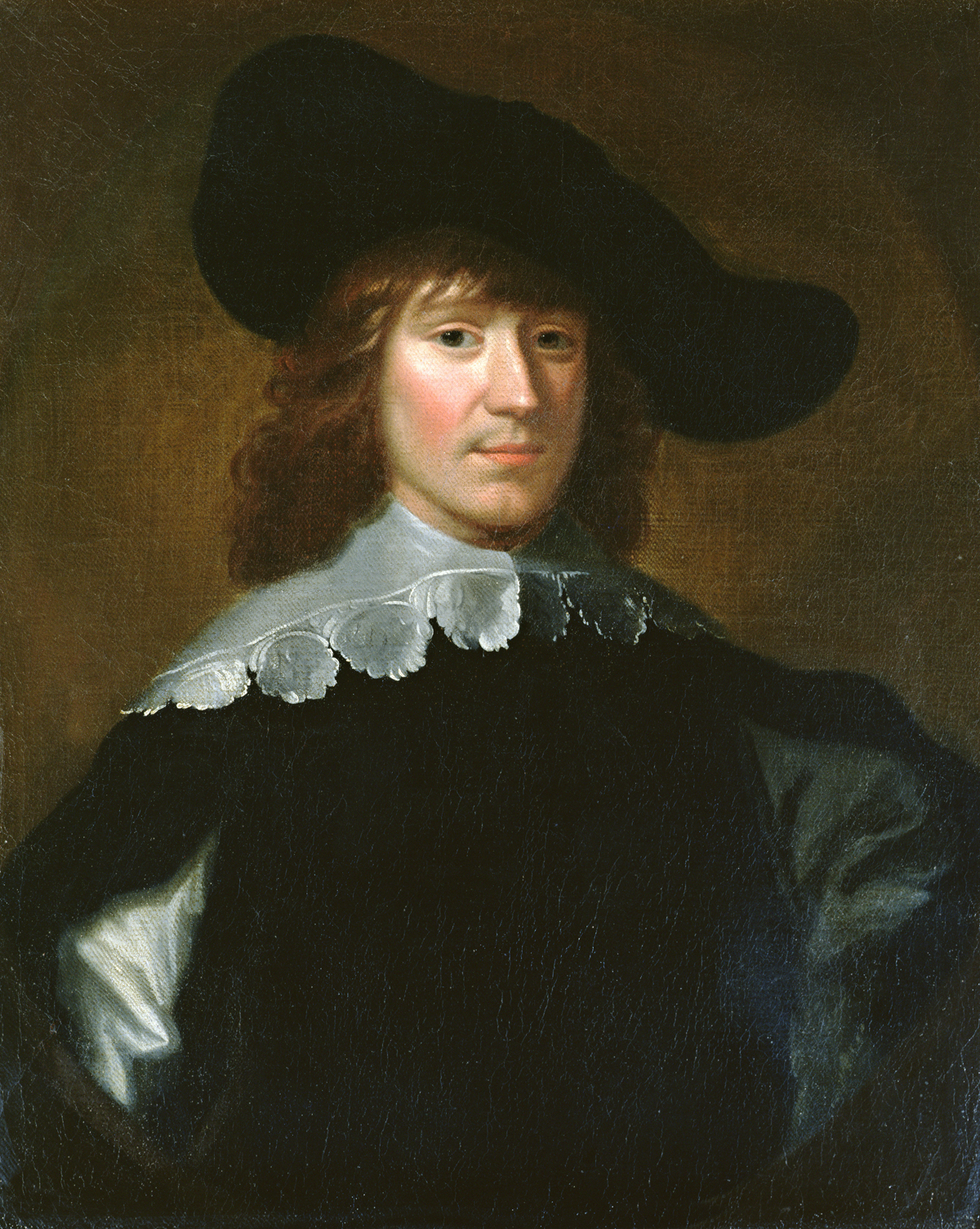
- Born: April 1602; Salisbury, Wiltshire, England
- Died: 24 September 1645 (aged 43); Rowton Heath, Cheshire, England

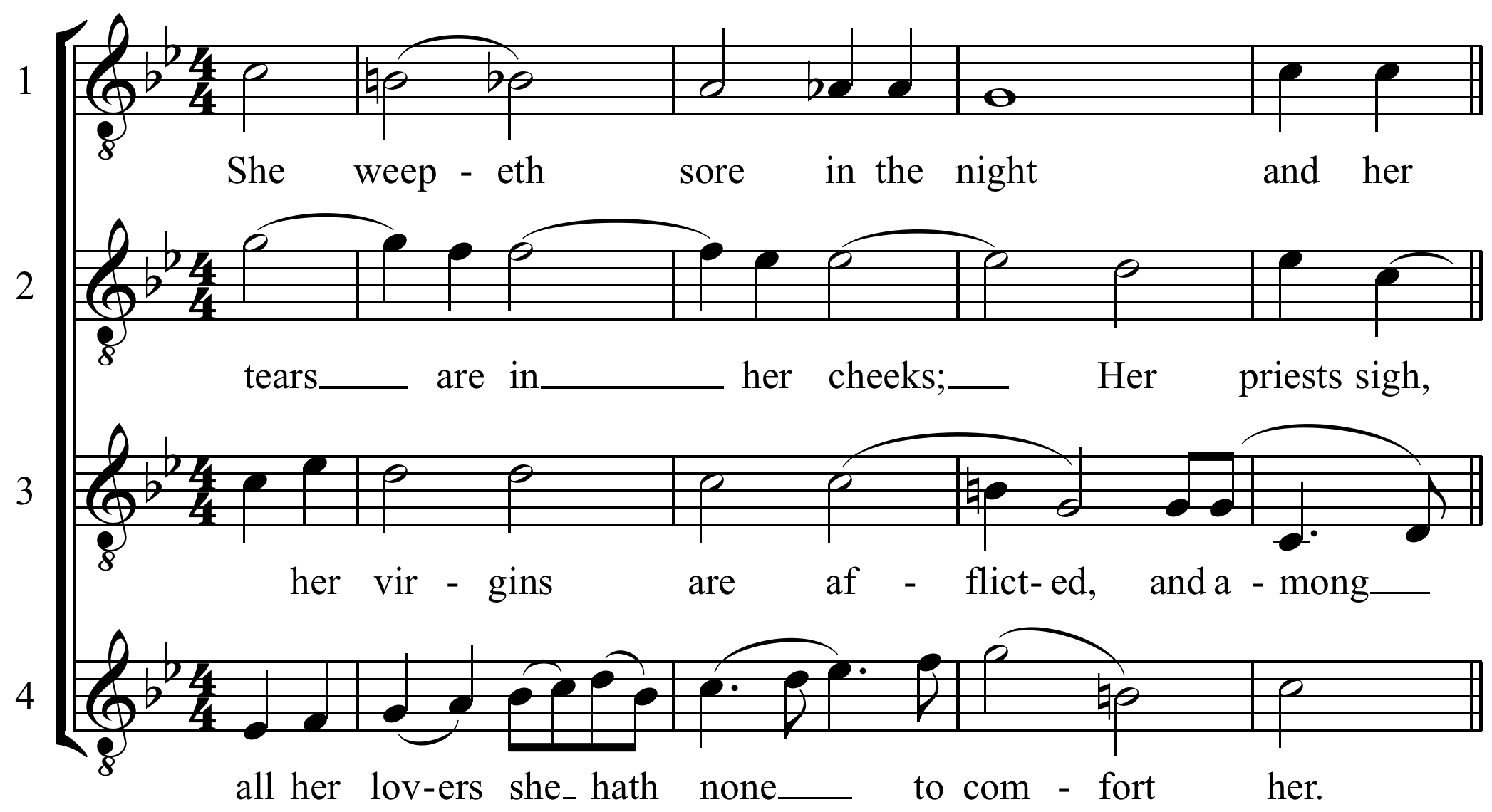
"She Weepeth Sore in the Night", four voice round

William Lawes (April 1602 – 24 September 1645) was an English composer and musician known for his innovative and experimental style of early Baroque music. Born in Salisbury, Wiltshire, he wrote sacred and secular music at the court of Charles I of England. His best known compositions are consort suites for viols, including the Royal Consort collection (completed 1635). He joined Royalist forces during the English Civil War and was honored with the title "Father of Musick" after being killed at the Battle of Rowton Heath.

== Life and career ==
Lawes was born in Salisbury, Wiltshire, and was baptised on 1 May 1602. He was the son of Thomas Lawes, a vicar choral at Salisbury Cathedral, and brother to Henry Lawes, a very successful composer in his own right. It is possible the young William was a member of the cathedral choir there.

His patron, Edward Seymour, Earl of Hertford, apprenticed him to the composer John Coprario, which probably brought Lawes into contact with Charles, Prince of Wales, at an early age. Both William and his elder brother Henry received court appointments after Charles succeeded to the British throne as Charles I. William was appointed as "musician in ordinary for lutes and voices" in 1635 but had been writing music for the court prior to this.

Lawes spent all his adult life in Charles's employ. He composed secular music and songs for court masques (and doubtless played in them), as well as sacred anthems and motets for Charles's private worship. He is most remembered today for his sublime viol consort suites for between three and six players and his lyra viol music. His use of counterpoint and fugue and his tendency to juxtapose bizarre, spine-tingling themes next to pastoral ones in these works made them disfavoured in the centuries after his death.

When Charles's dispute with Parliament led to the outbreak of the Civil War, Lawes joined the Royalist army. During the Siege of York, Lawes was living in the city and wrote at least one piece of music as a direct result of the military situation – the round See how Cawood's dragon looks, a vivid and defiant response to the Parliamentarian capture of Cawood Castle, about ten miles from York. He was given a post in the King's Life Guards, which was intended to keep him out of danger. Despite this, he was "casually shot" by a Parliamentarian in the rout of the Royalists at Rowton Heath, near Chester, on 24 September 1645. Although the King was in mourning for his kinsman Bernard Stuart (killed in the same defeat), he instituted a special mourning for Lawes, apparently honouring him with the title of "Father of Musick." The author of his epitaph, Thomas Jordan, closed it with a lachrymose pun on the fact that Lawes had died at the hands of those who denied the divine right of kings:

Will. Lawes was slain by such whose wills were laws.

Lawes's body was lost or destroyed and his burial site is unknown.

== Musical style ==
Lawes's instrumental music is typical of the 17th-century genre in England. Intense rhythmical gestures and dissonant harmonies stand in stark contrast with the traditional rules of counterpoint as practised by earlier composers known to Lawes, such as William Byrd. His writing style is highly mannered, oft experimental and virtuosic; melodies may be fragmented and altered with varied articulation and accentuation. Lawes was known to be a virtuoso on the lyra viol. There as well his music features chromatic extremes which are not normally encountered in works of the early Baroque. Nevertheless, his works, including two compositions on the cantus firmus In nomine, show that he was aware of the theoretical practices of his day.

He is particularly known for his ensemble dance music, which takes the form of suites called "consort sets," well appreciated by his contemporaries and successors. Ten of these sets form a fine and varied collection called the Royal Consort, completed in 1635 for Charles I of England. This was issued in two versions: for two treble viols, tenor viol, bass viol and theorbo continuo; and, later, for two violins, two bass viols and two theorbos. Until recently the violin version was the better known, thanks to editing work done in the 1960s, but scholarship has revealed the four-viol version to be of much better quality, having been the original setting. Many of Lawes's consort sets seem to have been composed as functional music or pedagogical pieces.

== Works ==
=== for Voice ===
- Dainty Fine Aniseed Water Fine, ca. 1630
- Drink Tonight of the Moonshine Bright, ca. 1630
- Gather Your Rosebuds While You May, ca. 1630
- She Weepeth Sore In the Night, ca. 1630

=== for Solo instrument ===
- Music for Solo Lyra-Viol, ca. 1630

=== for Instrumental ensemble ===
Note that the Royal Consort sets below exist in a primary scoring of 2 Treble Viols, Tenor Viol, Bass Viol and Theorbo (as thorough-bass, or continuo) as well as in an alternative, but recently discredited, scoring of 2 Treble Viols, 2 Bass Viols and 2 Theorbos (with the option of violins replacing the treble viols). Sources with the two-theorbo scoring show extra movements, notably a Fantasy and an Ecco each to open and close Sets 1 and 6, and adjustments to the sequence of movements.

- Almain for 2 Lutes, ca. 1625
- Almain for 3 Lyra-Viols, vdgs564, ca. 1630
- Almain for 4 Viols and Continuo, vdgs260, 1625
- Courante 1 for 2 Lutes, ca. 1625
- Courante 2 for 2 Lutes, ca. 1625
- Divisions on a Pavan in g for 2 Bass Viols and Organ, ca. 1638
- Eight Sonatas (Fantasy Suites) for Violin, Bass Viol and Organ, ca. 1630
- Eight Sonatas (Fantasy Suites) for 2 Violins, Bass Viol and Organ, ca. 1630
- Fantasy for 3 Lyra-Viols, vdgs567, ca. 1630
- Fantasy in c for 4 Viols, vdgs108, ca. 1630
- Organ Consort Set 1 (Fantasy—Air—Air) a 5 in g, On the Playnsong, ca. 1638
- Organ Consort Set 2 (Fantasy—Fantasy—Air) a 5 in a, For Ye Violls, ca. 1638
- Organ Consort Set 3 (Fantasy—Air—Pavan—Air) a 5 in c, ca. 1638
- Organ Consort Set 4 (Fantasy—Pavan—Air) a 5 in F, ca. 1638
- Organ Consort Set 5 (Fantasy—Pavan—Air) a 5 in C, ca. 1638
- Organ Consort Set 6 (Pavan—Fantasy—Air) a 6 in g, ca. 1638
- Organ Consort Set 7 (Fantasy—Fantasy—Air) a 6 in C, ca. 1638
- Organ Consort Set 8 (Air—Fantasy—Air—Fantasy) a 6 in F, Sunrise, ca. 1638
- Organ Consort Set 9 (Fantasy—Air—In nomine) a 6 in Bb, ca. 1638
- Organ Consort Set 10 (Fantasy—Fantasy—In nomine—Air) a 6 in c, ca. 1638
- Pavan for 4 Viols and Continuo, vdgs76, 1625
- Royal Consort Set 1 in d for 4 Viols and Continuo, 1635
- Royal Consort Set 2 in d for 4 Viols and Continuo, 1635
- Royal Consort Set 3 in d for 4 Viols and Continuo, 1635
- Royal Consort Set 4 in D for 4 Viols and Continuo, 1635
- Royal Consort Set 5 in D for 4 Viols and Continuo, 1635
- Royal Consort Set 6 in D for 4 Viols and Continuo, 1635
- Royal Consort Set 7 in a for 4 Viols and Continuo, 1635
- Royal Consort Set 8 in C for 4 Viols and Continuo, 1635
- Royal Consort Set 9 in F for 4 Viols and Continuo, 1635
- Royal Consort Set 10 in Bb for 4 Viols and Continuo, 1635
- Sarabande for 3 Lyra-Viols, vdgs569, ca. 1630
- Sarabande for 4 Viols and Continuo, vdgs264, 1625
- Set a 4 in g, ca. 1630

=== for the Church ===
- 30 3-part Psalm settings

=== for the Stage ===
- music for various masques
- Ye Fiends and Furies for Davenant's masque The Unfortunate Lovers

== Discography ==
Aire à 4, VdGS No.112, Oxford. Bodleian Library, Mus.Sch.b.2, p.33 (ca.1638-45)
Performed by Phillip W. Serna, Treble & Bass Viols

- For ye violls: Consort setts in 5 & 6 parts

Fretwork & Paul Nicholson; Virgin Classics 91187-2; 1991

- Sonatas for violin, bass viol and organ

London Baroque; Harmonia Mundi HMA 1901493; 1994

- Fantasia Suites for two violins, bass viol and organ

The Purcell Quartet; Chandos CHAN0552, 1994

- Royall Consort Suites

The Purcell Quartet with Nigel North & Paul O'Dette; Chandos CHAN0584/5, 1995

- Consort Music for Viols, Lutes and Theorbos

the Rose Consort of Viols, Timothy Roberts, Jacob Heringman & David Miller; Naxos 8.550601; 1995

- Royall Consort Suites vol 1

The Greate Consort; Gaudeamus CD GAU146, 1995

- Concord is conquer'd: Consort setts for 5 & 6 viols. 4 Herrick songs. Pieces for lyra viol

Fretwork, Catherine Bott, Richard Boothby & Paul Nicholson; Virgin Classics 5451472; 1995

- Royall Consort Suites vol 2

The Greate Consort; CD GAU147, 1997

- The Royal Consort & lute songs

René Jacobs, Sigiswald Kuijken, Lucy van Dael, Wieland Kuijken, Toyohiko Satoh, Edward Witsenbug, Gustav Leonhardt; Sony Classical 1997

- Fantazia suites for violin, bass viol and organ

Music's Re-creation; Centaur CRC 2385; 1998

- Suites pour une et trois lyra-violes

Jonathan Dunford, Sylvia Abramowicz & Sylvia Moquet; Adès 465 607–2; 1998

- Consorts in four and five parts

Phantasm & Sarah Cunningham; Channel Classics CCS 15698; 2000

- Consorts in six parts

Phantasm, Susanne Braumann & Varpu Haavisto; Channel Classics CCS 17498; 2002

- Consort Sets in Five & Six Parts, Jordi Savall – Hespèrion XXI – Alia Vox 9823 A+B
- Consort sets in five & six parts,

Hespèrion XXI, Alia Vox AV9823A, AV9823B; 2002

- Knock'd on the head: William Lawes, music for viols

Concordia, Metronome MET CD 1045; 2002

- William Lawes: In loving memory. Musica Oscura 070972-2
- Harp Consorts

Maxine Eilander et Les Voix Humaines; ATMA Classique ACD22372; 2008

- The Royall Consorts

Les Voix Humaines; ATMA Classique ACD22373; 2012

- The Royal Consort

Phantasm & Laurence Dreyfus; Linn CKD470; 2015

- Royal Consorts: Music for English Kings

Latitude 37; ABC Classics 4812100; 2015

== See also ==
- Drexel 4041
