= Drexel 4175 =

- New York Public Library for the Performing Arts
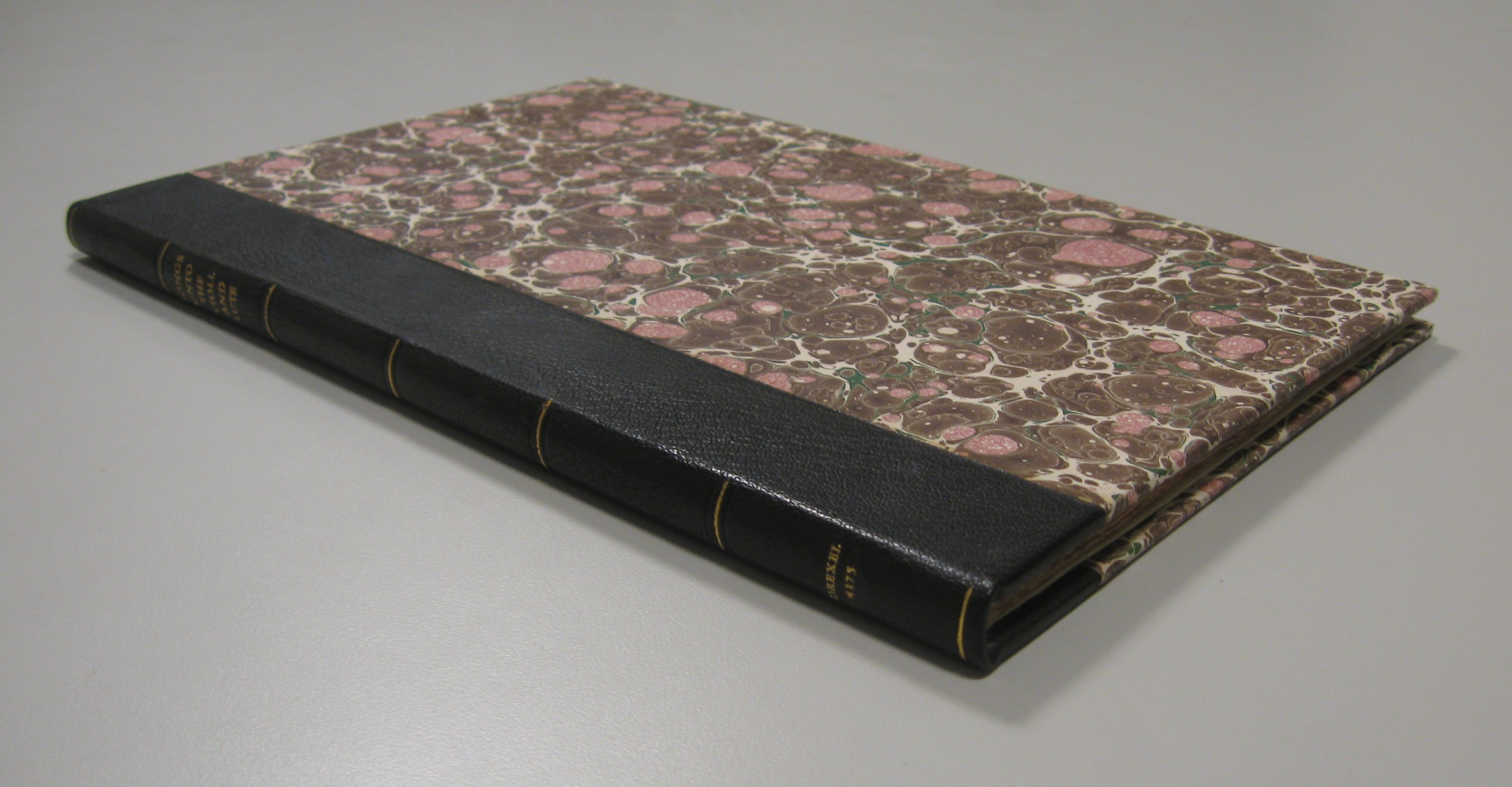
- Drexel 4175
- Also known as: Ann Twice, Her Book; Songs unto the violl and lute
- Type: Commonplace book
- Date: between 1620 and 1630
- Place of origin: England
- Language(s): English
- Size: 25 leaves

Drexel 4175, also known by an inscription on its cover, "Ann Twice, Her Book" or by the inscription on its first leaf, "Songs unto the violl and lute," is a music manuscript commonplace book. It is a noted source of songs from English Renaissance theatre, considered to be "indispensable to the rounding-out of our picture of seventeenth-century English song." It is believed to contain the original music of the song "Come Away, Hecket" as heard in Thomas Middleton's play The Witch which was used in William Shakespeare's Macbeth. Belonging to the New York Public Library, the manuscript forms part of the Music Division's Drexel Collection, located at the New York Public Library for the Performing Arts. Following traditional library practice, its name is derived from its call number.

== Dating ==
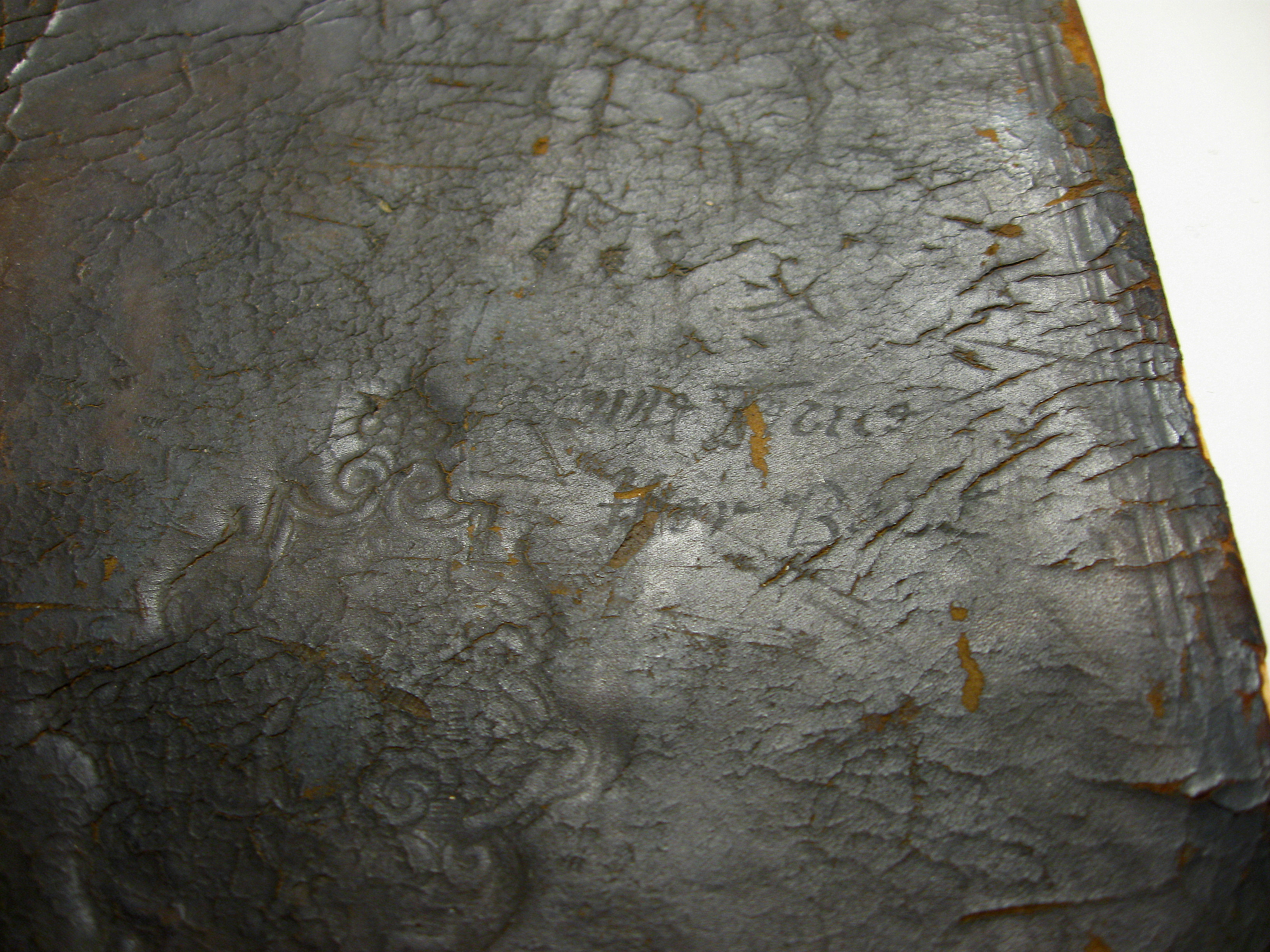
Close-up of the original cover showing the now faded inscription

John Stafford Smith suggested a date "about the year 1620" for the two songs ("Ist for a grace" and "You herralds of Mrs hart") he printed in his compilation Musica Antiqua. Duckles mistakenly took this date to refer to the entire manuscript, an assumption continued by Cutts. In the introduction to the facsimile edition, Jorgens emended this misinterpretation, stating that scholars date the manuscript between 1620 and 1630. She noted a problem posed by the song "Like to the damask rose": If the composer attribution of Henry Lawes is accepted, the appearance of this song in a manuscript from the 1620s pushes back the composer's reputation ten years before to most musicologists' understanding of his career. If the attribution is incorrect, then that casts doubt on the manuscript's many attributions.

== Provenance ==
Issues of provenance for Drexel 4175 begin with its cover. Its inscription "Ann Twice, Her Book" would indicate that one of the previous owners was Ann Twice, although no information has surfaced on who she was. The first page has two inscriptions on it; the first is "Songs unto the violl and Lute." Beneath that is the note: "my Cosen Twice Leffte this Booke with me when shee went to Broisil which is to be returne to her AGhaine when she Come to Glost." Based on this note, musicologist Ian Spink concluded that Ann Twice lived in Gloucester around 1620 (the date based on John Stafford Smith's attributions). Assuming the songs were copied for her use, Spink surmised that Twice must have been a good singer whose music master (the copyist of the manuscript) was "a man of taste." At some point she traveled to Bristol where she left the manuscript with her cousin, the writer of this inscription (whose name is unknown). The whereabouts of the manuscript are then unknown for nearly two centuries until Smith included selections in his collection Musica Antiqua. In that publication Smith included a note referring to himself as the manuscript's owner. Smith actually marked the manuscript to indicate those songs to be included in Musica Antiqua.

It is not known whether Edward Francis Rimbault purchased the volume directly from the sale of Smith's estate, but it eventually came into his possession. Rimbault apparently lent the manuscript to Thomas Oliphant, cataloger of the British Museum (today the British Library). Oliphant's letter was affixed to front of manuscript stating that Oliphant made several "memorandums" (pencil markings in the manuscript). This letter is mentioned in the catalog of the Rimbault library auction, where it is listed as lot no. 1389 (the lot number can be seen penciled in on the first leaf).

After Rimbault's death in 1876 followed by the auction of his estate in 1877, the manuscript was one of about 600 lots purchased by Philadelphia-born financier Joseph W. Drexel, who had already amassed a large music library. Upon Drexel's death, he bequeathed his music library to The Lenox Library. When the Lenox Library merged with the Astor Library to become the New York Public Library, the Drexel Collection became the basis for one of its founding units, the Music Division. Today, Drexel 4175 is part of the Drexel Collection in the Music Division, now located at the New York Public Library for the Performing Arts at Lincoln Center.

== Physical state ==
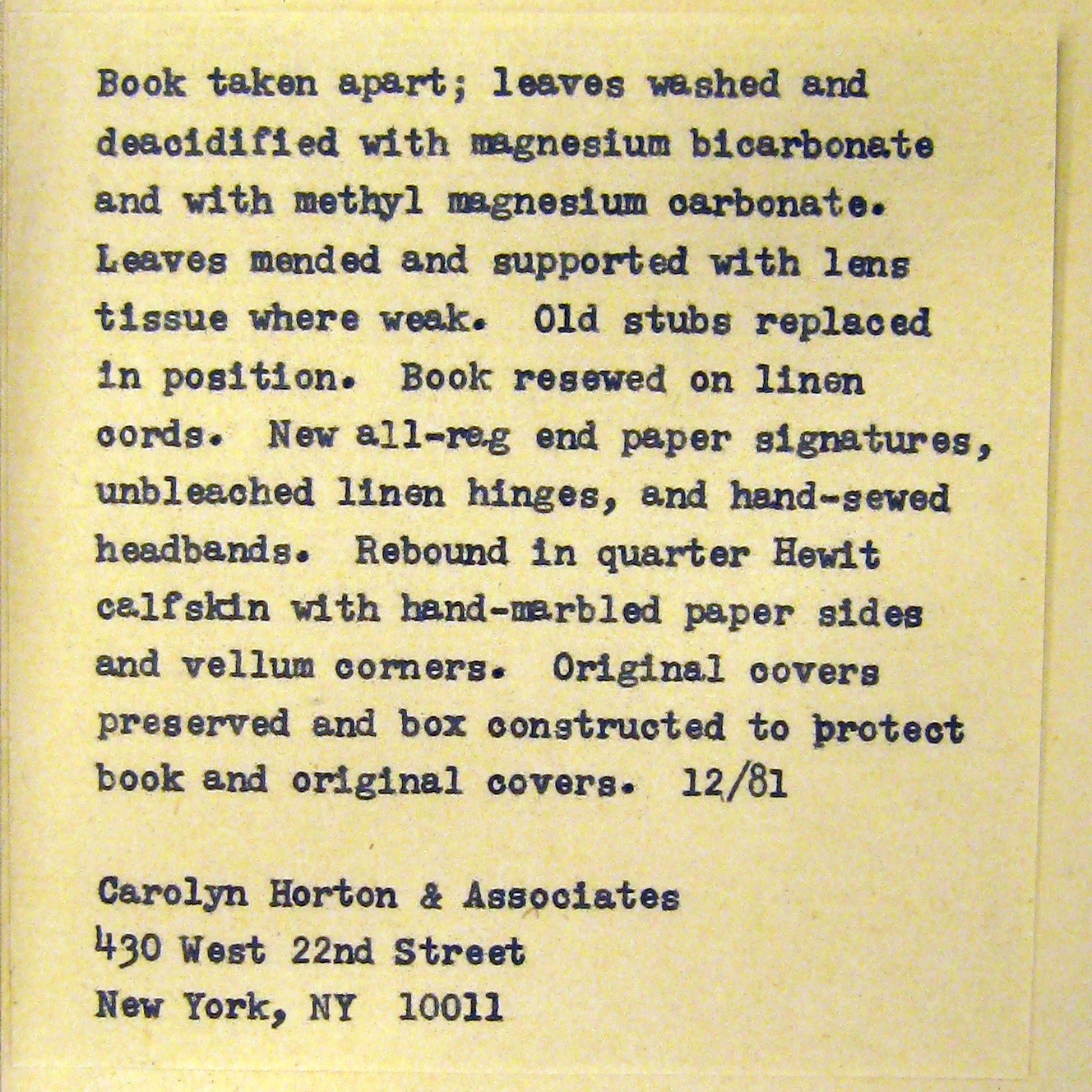
Drexel 4175 label attesting to preservation work by Carolyn Horton & Associates

The manuscript measures 30.5 × 19 × 1 centimetre (12.01 × 7.48 × 0.39 in).

According to the manuscript's table of contents, there were originally 58 songs, including blank spaces intended for songs 59 and 60. The manuscript's numbering left out numbers 38 and 45. At some point a number of songs were removed so that, today, there are only 25 leaves containing 28 songs. At least one song appears to have been removed since the time of Smith's ownership. "Rest awhile you cruell cares" (no. 39 of the table below) was noted by Smith and Oliphant, but is not present in the manuscript. Cutts questioned why it was removed, surmising the reason might have been for the song on its verso, "Haue you seen ye"?

Due to its poor physical state, Drexel 4175 was rebound by conservators Carolyn Horton & Associates in 1981. The cover was separated and a new binding with marbled covers supplied.

== Content ==
Of the 28 songs currently contained in the manuscript, six are from plays or masques (nos. 24, 29, 40, 43, 47, 52). Seven of the missing songs are also from dramatic works (nos. 2, 4, 5, 13, 19, 30 and 38). Seventeen of the songs have a simple bass accompaniment, ten have accompaniment notated in lute tablature (nos. 40–42, 50–51, 53–57) and one song lacks accompaniment (no. 58). Two songs are duplicates: No. 24 (no. xxiv) "Cupid is Venus only ioy" is repeated at no. 54 (no. lvi) and no. 40 (no. xli) "Deare doe not your faire beuty wronge" is repeated at no. 49 (li).

In its repetition at no. 49 (li), "Deare doe not your faire beuty wronge" is the only song to have a composer attribution, that of Robert Johnson. Johnson is represented by several songs in the manuscript: "O let vs howle" (no. 4 from The Duchess of Malfi), "Tell mee dearest what is loue" (no. 43 from The Captain), "Haue you seene the bright lilly growe" (no. 47 from The Devil is an Ass), and "Heare yee ladyes yt" (formerly part of the manuscript as no. 19 from Valentinian). Cutts notes that all these plays were produced by King's Men, the repertory company to which Shakespeare belonged and for which Johnson wrote music from 1608-1617.

Smith appears to have been the first to publish anything from the manuscript. He included six songs from it in his 1812 publication Musica Antiqua: "Come away, come away hecket" (no. 52), "Though your stragnes freet my hart" (no. 25), "Deare doe not your faire beuty wronge" (nos. 40 and 49), "Ist for a grace or ist for some mislike" (no. 20), "You herralds of Mrs hart" (no. 56), and "When I sit as iudge betweene vertue and loues princely dame" (no. 26).

Smith apparently took particular interest in "Come away hecket" (no. 52), going as far as to note that it was the music used in Thomas Middleton's play The Witch. Cutts took great interest in the song, surmising that the song was probably in the possession of a member of the King's Men, which is how it is quoted in the 1623 folio of Shakespeare's Macbeth. Comparing it to another "witch" song known to have been composed by Johnson, "Come away ye lady gay", Cutts feels that similar attributes of compositional technique and verbal rhythm suggest that Johnson also composed "Come away hecket." Cutts used this evidence to underscore his theory that this song was an inspiration for the witches' scene in Macbeth.

Based on the titles of the missing songs provided in the table of contents, Cutts was able to make observations (sometimes extensive) on the content, when possible noting their existence in different contemporaneous manuscript collections.

Of those who have studied the manuscript, none have made more than fleeting comments on the manuscript's non-musical content, consisting of recipes and poems. Curiously, the recipes have been written upside down in comparison to the remainder of the book. Duckles specifically mentioned recipes for carpe pye, pigeon pye, marrow pudding and French bread.

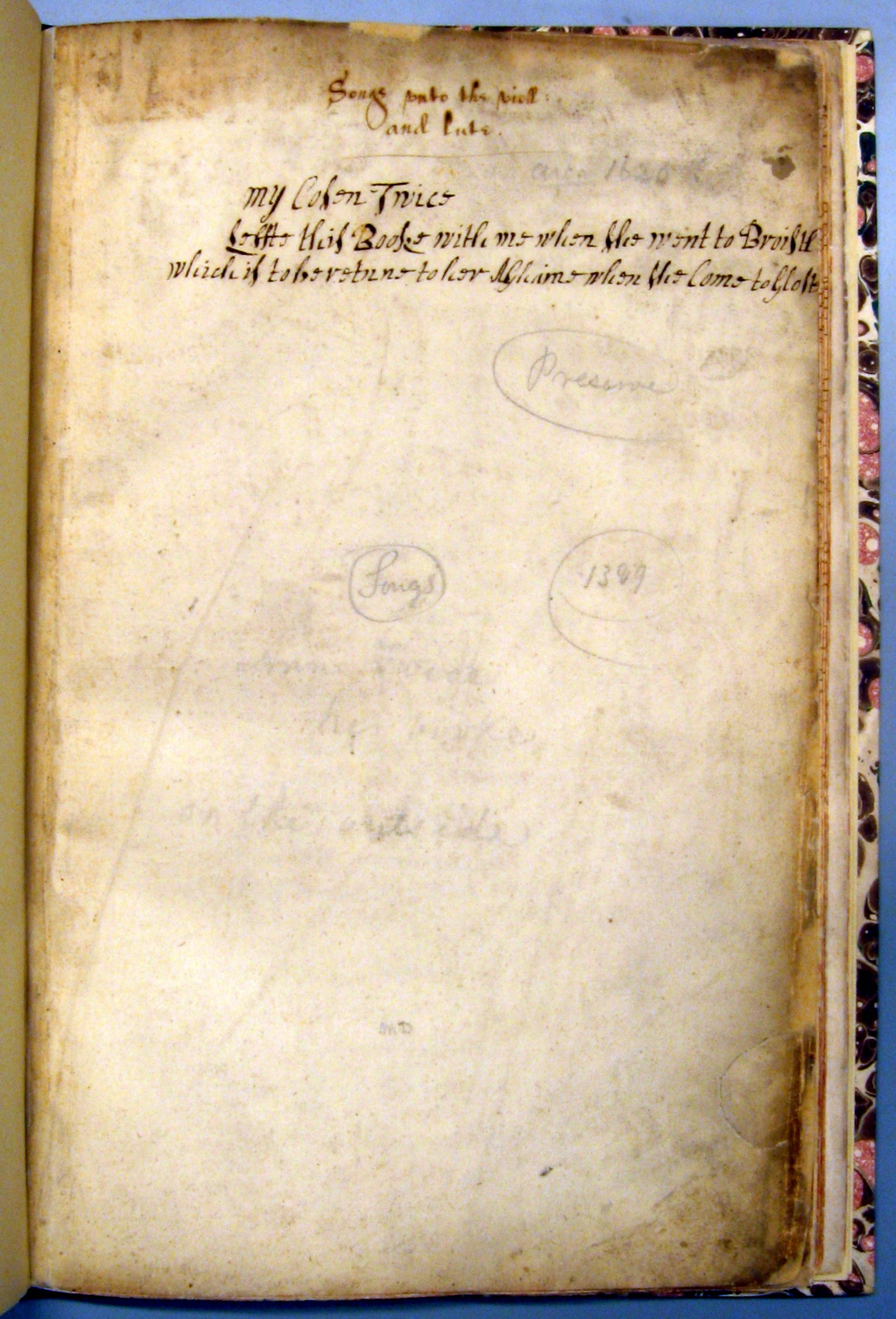
Drexel 4175, inscription on first leaf

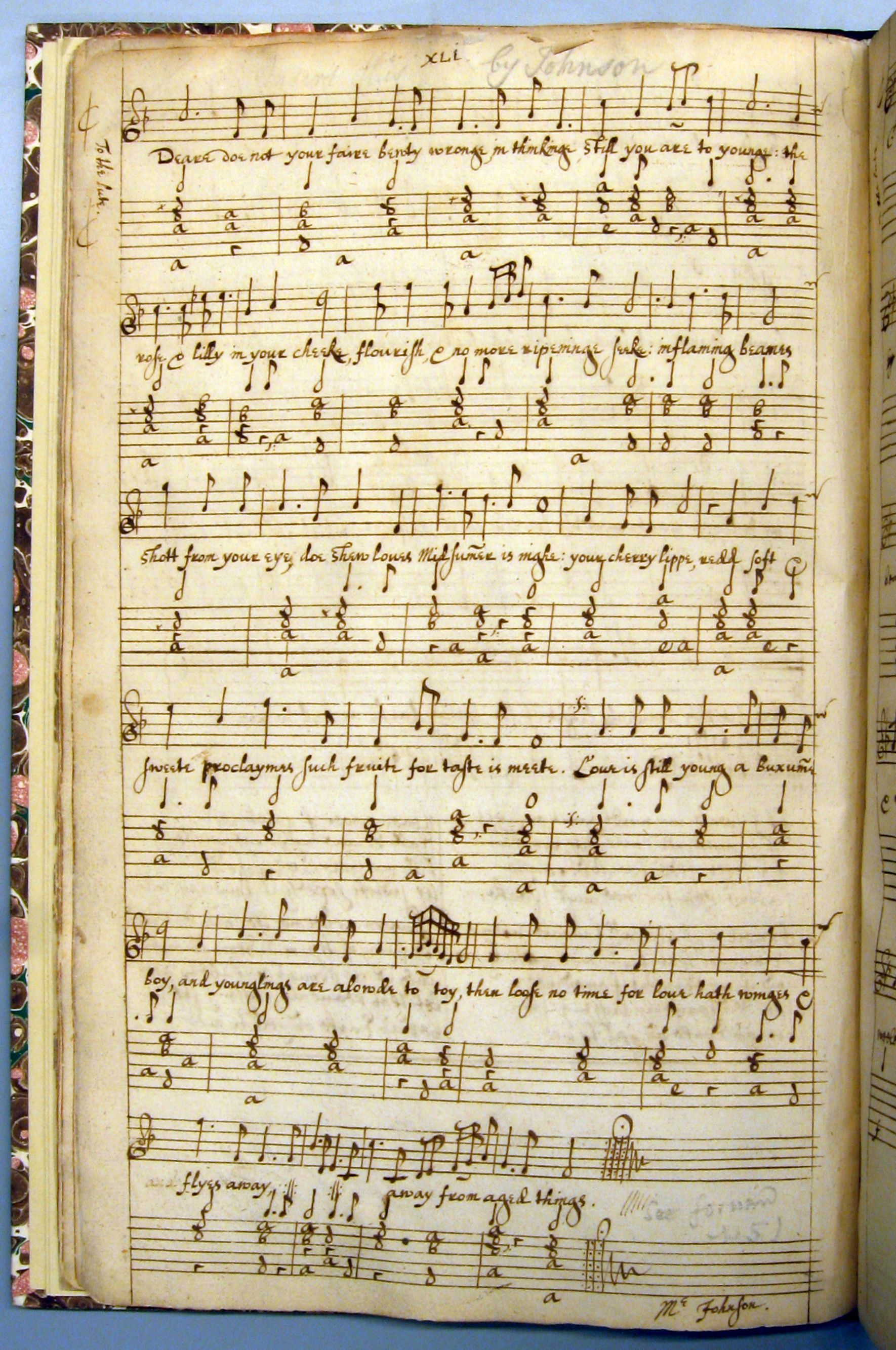
"Deare doe not your faire beuty wronge" in lute tablature; the only song to have a composer attribution (at bottom right)

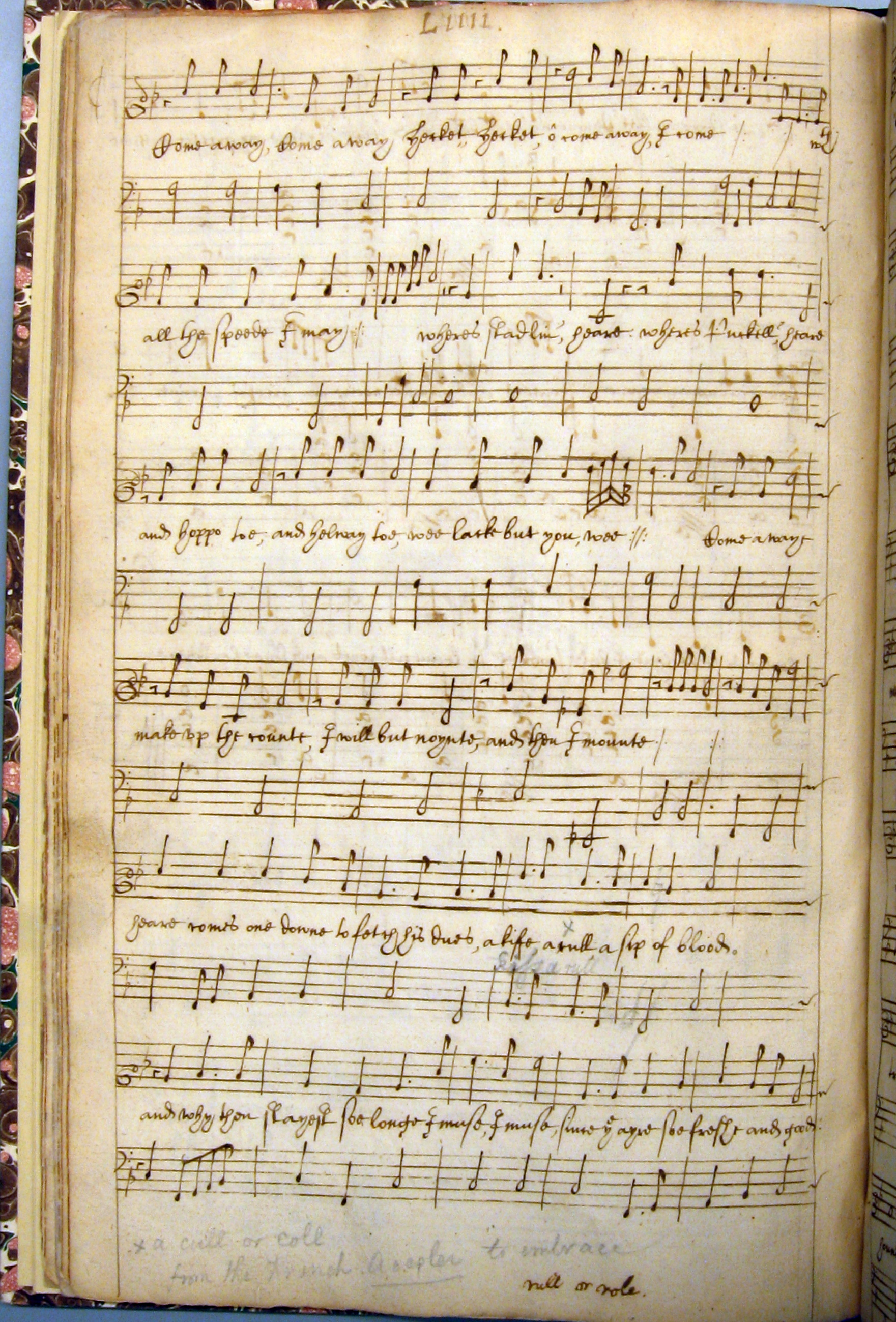
"Come away hecket"

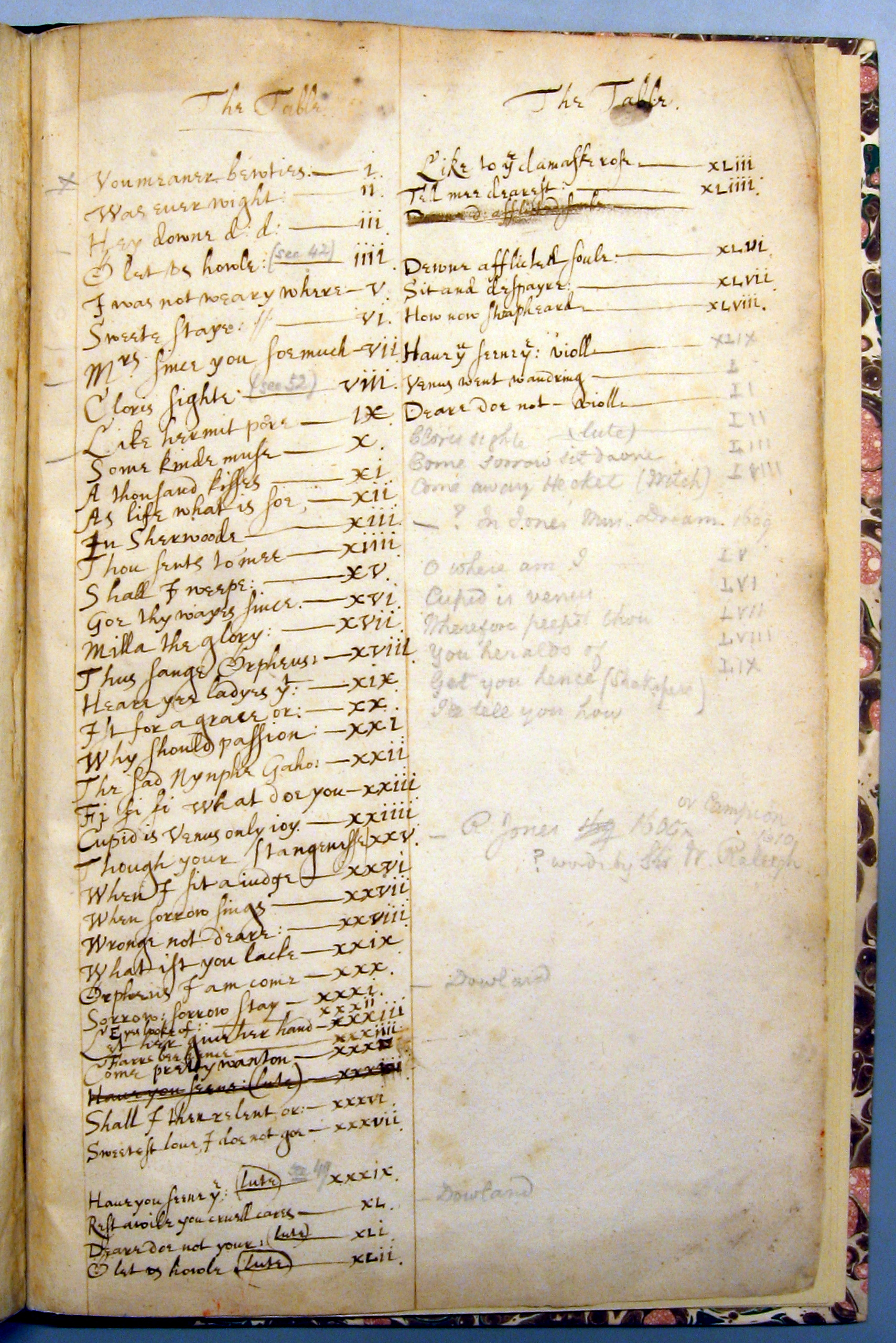
Drexel 4175 Table of contents (the final leaf) with annotations in pencil by British Museum librarian Thomas Oliphant

== List of contents ==
This list is based on the table of contents and includes numbering from Jorgens and the numbering used in the manuscript. Those songs not in the manuscript are indicated in the column as "Not in ms." with a row color of silver. Most of the attributions and remarks were provided by Cutts.

Jorgens	# ms.	Title	In ms.?	Attributions	Remarks
1	I	You meaner bewties	Not in ms.	lyric by Henry Wotton	probably written about 1612-1613; first printed in Michael East's "The Sixt Set of Bookes" (1624)
2	ii	Was euer wight	Not in ms.	lyric by Thomas Edwards	from Cephalus and Procris
3	iii	He downe d: d:	Not in ms.		a frequent refrain of Elizabethan songs and later
4	iiii	O let vs howle	Not in ms.	music ascribed to Robert Johnson; text by John Webster	From The Duchess of Malfi; another copy at no. 42
5	v	I was not weary where	Not in ms.	music ascribed to Nicholas Lanier; text by Ben Jonson	The epilogue to The Vision of Delight (1617)
6	vi	Sweete staye ://:	Not in ms.	Lyric ascribed to John Donne	Ascriptions based on publications of Dowland (1612) and Gibbons (1612)
7	vii	Mrs since you soe much	Not in ms.	lyric by Thomas Campion	Published in Philip Rosseter's A Booke of Ayres (1601)
8	viii	Cloris sighte	Not in ms.	music by Richard Balls (died in 1622); lyric attributed by John Donne to William Herbert, 3rd earl of Pembroke	in Poems (1678); a song with this title appears in New Ayres and Dialogues (1678); another copy at lii
9	ix	Like hermit poore	Not in ms.	translation of a sonnet by Philippe Desportes possibly by Walter Raleigh	
10	x	Some kinde muse	Not in ms.		
11	xi	A thousand kisses	Not in ms.		Most likely the same as "A thousand kisses wynns my hearte from mee" in British Library manuscript Add. 24665
12	xii	As life what is soe	Not in ms.		Found by Norman Ault in a British Library manuscript dated 1624
13	xiii	In Sherwoode	Not in ms.		possibly the lyric with the same title in A Musicall Dreame (1609) by Robert Jones
14	xiiii	Thou sents to me	Not in ms.	lyric by Robert Aytoun	
15	xv	Shall I weepe	Not in ms.		
16	xvi	Goe thy wayes since	Not in ms.		The text of stanzas 2-5 present without music; begins “Yet I will not curse those eyes”
17	xvii	Milla the glorie of whose bewteous rayes			A variant of the "May and Time" riddle from Thomas Morley's The First Booke of Ayres, or little short Songs (1600)
18	xviii	Thus sange Orpheus	Not in ms.		Possibly identical to the version published in Walter Porter's Madrigales and Ayres first published in 1632 but likely composed before that
19	xix	Heare yee ladyes yt	Not in ms.	text by John Fletcher; music by Robert Johnson	From the play Valentinian
20	xx	Ist for a grace or ist for some mislike		lyric by John Harington	First published in 1633 but found in earlier manuscripts
21	xxi	Why should pasion leade mee blinde			The lyric was first published in 1660 but dating earlier
22	xxii	The say Dymph, Gaho, followes to the shadie woods			
23	xxiii	Fi, fi, fi, fi, what doe you meane by this?			
24	xxiiii	Cupid is Venus only ioy		text by Thomas Middleton	from A Chaste Maid in Cheapside; another copy at lvi
25	xxv	Though your stragnes freet my hart		music by Robert Jones? Thomas Campion?	
26	xxvi	When I sit as iudge betweene vertue and loues princely dame			
27	xxvii	When sorrowe singes a litle a litles enough			
28	xxviii	Wrong not deare Empress of my hearte			Lyric attributed to Walter Raleigh
29	xxix	What is you lacke, what would you buy			from The Masque of Mountebankes (1618); this version incomplete
30	xxx	Orpheus I am come	Not in ms.	lyric by John Fletcher	From The Mad Lover
31	xxxi	Sorrow: sorrow stay	Not in ms.		Possibly the same as the one composed by John Dowland
32	xxxii	Eyes looke of [off]	Not in ms.		A song with this title appears in other contemporaneous manuscripts
33	xxxiii	Let her giue her hand	Not in ms.		A song with this title appears in other contemporaneous manuscripts
34	xxxiiii	Fares [Fairies?] be hence	Not in ms.		
35	xxxv	Come pretty wanton	Not in ms.		A song with this title appears in other contemporaneous manuscripts
					"Haue you seene [lute]"; entry is crossed out
36	xxxvi	Shall I then relent, or:	Not in ms.		
37	xxxvii	Sweetest loue, I doe not goe	Not in ms.		Text possibly by John Donne
	xxxviii				No song xxxviii in list
38	xxxix	Haue you seense ye [lute]	Not in ms.	lyric by Ben Jonson	From the play The Devil is an Ass (1616); another copy at 47 (xlix)
39	xl	Rest awile you cruell cares		music by [John Dowland]	Published in The First Booke of Songes or Ayres (1597)
40	xli	Deare doe not your faire beuty wronge		music by Robert Johnson, text by Thomas May	from the play The Old Couple (1636); lute tablature; another copy at li; the only song in the collection with authorial ascription
41	xlii	O let vs howle some heauy note		music by Robert Johnson	lute tablature
42	xliii	Like to the damaske rose you see		music by Henry Lawes	lute tablature
43	xliiii	Tell mee dearest what is loue		music by Robert Johnson; text by Francis Beaumont and John Fletcher	From the play The Captain
	xlv				No song xlv
44	xlvi	Downe [downe] afflicted soule and paye thy due			Appears in contemporaneous manuscripts
45	xlvii	Sit and despayre	Not in ms.		Appears in contemporaneous manuscripts
46	xlviii	How now sheapheard	Not in ms.		Appears in contemporaneous manuscripts
47	xlix	Haue you seene the bright lilly growe		lyric by Ben Jonson	From the play The Devil is an Ass (1616);
48	l	Venus went wandringe Adonis to finde			Appears in contemporaneous manuscripts
49	li	Deare doe not your faire bewty wrounge		music by Robert Johnson	another copy at 40
50	lii	Cloris sighte, and sange, and wepte		music by Alphonso Bales?	lute tablature; another copy at 8
51	liii	Come sorrowe sitt downe by this tree			lute tablature
52	liiii	Come away, Come away hecket		lyric by Thomas Middleton; music attributed to Robert Johnson	From the play The Witch
53	lv	O where am I, what may I thinke		lyric attributed to Samuel Brooke	lute tablature
54	lvi	Cupid is Venus only ioy			lute tablature; another copy at 24
55	lvii	Wherefore peepst thou enuious day?		music by John Wilson, lyric by John Donne	lute tablature
56	lviii	You herralds of Mrs hart			Music attributed to John Wilson by Rimbault (who wrote in the manuscript); lute tablature
57	lix	Get you hence for I must goe			lute tablature
58		Ile tell you how the rose grewe redd		Text by William Strode	lacking accompaniment; unnumbered

== Bibliography ==
- Cutts, John P. (1956), "The Original Music to Middleton's The Witch", Shakespeare Quarterly, 7 (2): 203–209, doi:10.2307/2866439, JSTOR 2866439
- Cutts, John P. (1962), "'Songs Vnto the Violl and Lute': Drexel Ms. 4175", Musica Disciplina, 16: 73–92
- Duckles, Vincent H. (Jan 1953), "Jacobean Theatre Songs", Music & Letters, 34 (1): 88–89, doi:10.1093/ml/xxxiv.1.88
- Henze, Catherine A. (Spring 2000), "How Music Matters: Some Songs of Robert Johnson in the Plays of Beaumont and Fletcher", Comparative Drama, 34 (1): 1–32, doi:10.1353/cdr.2000.0026
- Mateer, David (1999), "Hugh Davis's Commonplace Book: A New Source of Seventeenth-Century Song", Royal Musical Association Research Chronicle, 32: 63–87, doi:10.1080/14723808.1999.10540984
- Smith, John Stafford (1812), Musica Antiqua: a Selection of Music of This and Other Countries From the Commencement of the Twelfth to the Beginning of the Eighteenth Century, London: Preston
- Spink, Ian (May 1962), "Ann Twice, Her Booke", Musical Times, 103 (1431): 316, doi:10.2307/948800, JSTOR 948800
- Walls, Peter (July 1984), "'Music and Sweet Poetry'? Verse for English Lute Song and Continuo Song", Music & Letters, 65 (3): 237–254, doi:10.1093/ml/65.3.237

Facsimile

- Jorgens, Elise Bickford, ed. (1987). Miscellaneous Manuscripts. English song, 1600-1675: Facsimiles of Twenty-Six Manuscripts and an Edition of the Texts. Vol. 11. New York: Garland. ISBN 9780824082413.
