= 1613 in literature =

This article contains information about the literary events and publications of 1613.

== Events ==
- January–February – The English royal court sees massive celebrations for the marriage of Frederick V, Elector Palatine, to King James's daughter Princess Elizabeth, culminating in their wedding on February 14.
  - During court festivities in the winter of 1612–1613, the King's Men give twenty performances, which include eight Shakespeare plays, four by Beaumont and Fletcher, and the lost Cardenio.
  - Early January – The Children of the Queen's Revels give two performances of Beaumont and Fletcher's Cupid's Revenge.
  - January 11 – The English playing company that had been the Admiral's Men, then Prince Henry's Men, becomes the Elector Palatine's (or Palsgrave's) Men.
  - February 15 – The Memorable Masque of the Middle Temple and Lincoln's Inn, written by George Chapman and designed by Inigo Jones, is staged in the Great Hall of the Palace of Whitehall. Francis Beaumont's The Masque of the Inner Temple and Gray's Inn follows five days later on February 20.
  - February 25 – The Lady Elizabeth's Men perform Marston's The Dutch Courtesan at Court. (They repeat it at the end of the year, on December 12.)
  - February 27 – The Queen's Revels Children act Chapman's The Widow's Tears.
  - Early March – Frederick and Prince Charles visit the University of Cambridge, where they see performances of Samuel Brooke's Latin plays Adelphe and Scyros.
- June 5
  - Cyril Tourneur is commissioned by Robert Daborne to write one act of the play The Arraignment of London in order to help meet a deadline. Later in the year, Tourneur is paid £10 for delivering letters from the Stuart monarchy to Brussels.
  - The English poet Francis Quarles attends the newly married Queen on her progress to Continental Europe.
- June 8 – The King's Men re-play Cardenio at Court.
- June 29 – The Globe Theatre in London burns down during a performance of Henry VIII.
- unknown date – Elizabeth Cary, Lady Falkland's closet drama The Tragedy of Mariam, the Fair Queen of Jewry (written 1602–1604) is published in London as the first original dramatic work in English known to have been published by a woman and acknowledged as such ("Written by that learned, vertuous, and truly noble Ladie, E. C.").

== New books ==
=== Prose ===
- Miguel de Cervantes – Exemplary Novels
- Thomas Dekker – A Strange Horse Race
- Samuel Purchas - Purchas His Pilgrimage. Or Relations of the World and the Religions Observed in All Ages Discouered, from the Creation unto This Present
- Mark Ridley – A Short Treatise of Magneticall Bodies and Motions
- Sir Anthony Shirley – Sir Anthony Shirley: his Relation of his Travels into Persia
- Alexander Whitaker – Good Newes from Virginia
- George Wither – Abuses Stript, and Whipt (satires)

=== Drama ===
- Anonymous – Heteroclitanomalonomia
- Giovan Battista Andreini – L'Adamo
- Francis Beaumont
  - The Knight of the Burning Pestle published
  - The Masque of the Inner Temple and Gray's Inn
- Beaumont and Fletcher – The Honest Man's Fortune
- Samuel Brooke – Adelphe and Scyros (in Latin)
- Thomas Campion
  - The Lords' Masque
  - The Somerset Masque
- Elizabeth Cary, Lady Falkland – The Tragedy of Mariam
- George Chapman
  - The Memorable Masque of the Middle Temple and Lincoln's Inn
  - The Revenge of Bussy D'Ambois published
- Lope de Vega
  - La dama boba (The Foolish Lady)
  - El perro del hortelano (The Dog in the Manger)
  - San Diego de Alcalá
- Thomas Heywood
  - The Silver Age (published)
  - The Brazen Age (published)
- Ben Jonson (masques)
  - A Challenge at Tilt, at a Marriage
  - The Irish Masque at Court
- John Marston and William Barksted – The Insatiate Countess (published)
- Thomas Middleton – A Chaste Maid in Cheapside
- William Shakespeare – Henry VIII
- Shakespeare and John Fletcher (attributed) – The History of Cardenio
- John Webster – The Duchess of Malfi (approximate date)

=== Poetry ===
- William Drummond of Hawthornden – Tears on the Death of Moeliades

== Births ==
- February 11 – Henry Killigrew, English dramatist (died 1700)
- April – Franciscus Plante, Dutch poet (died 1690)
- June 16 – John Cleveland, English poet (died 1658)
- August 15
  - Gilles Ménage, French classicist and historian (died 1692)
  - Jeremy Taylor, English writer and cleric (died 1667)
- September 15 – François de La Rochefoucauld, French writer of maxims and memoirs (died 1680)
- November 5 – Isaac de Benserade, French poet (died 1691)
- probable year – Richard Crashaw, English poet (died 1667)

== Deaths ==
- January 28 – Sir Thomas Bodley, English founder of the Bodleian Library (born 1545)
- February 16 – Mikalojus Daukša, Lithuanian religious writer and translator (born c. 1527)
- August 18 – Giovanni Artusi, Italian music theorist (born c. 1540)
- August 21 – Natshinnaung, Toungoo prince, poet and musician (executed, born 1578)
- August 26 – George Owen, Welsh antiquarian (born 1552)
- September 15 – Sir Thomas Overbury, English poet and essayist (probably poisoned, born 1581)
- October 9 – Henry Constable, English Catholic polemicist and poet (born 1562)
- October 22 – Mathurin Régnier, French satirist (born 1573)
- November 16 – Trajano Boccalini, Italian satirist (born 1556)
