= The Witch (play) =

17th-century play by Thomas Middleton

The Witch is a Jacobean play, a tragicomedy written by Thomas Middleton. The play was acted by the King's Men at the Blackfriars Theatre. It is thought to have been written between 1613 and 1616; it was not printed in its own era, and existed only in manuscript until it was published by Isaac Reed in 1778.

== The manuscript ==
The still-extant manuscript (since 1821, MS. Malone 12 in the collection of the Bodleian Library), a small quarto-sized bundle of 48 leaves, is in the hand of Ralph Crane, the professional scribe who worked for the King's Men in this era, and who prepared several texts for the First Folio of Shakespeare's plays, as well as two of the surviving manuscripts of Middleton's A Game at Chess, plus other King's Men's works. Since Middleton wrote for the King's Men in this period, the Crane connection is unsurprising. The manuscript bears Middleton's dedication to Thomas Holmes, Esq. There, Middleton refers to the play as "ignorantly ill-fated." This was long taken to mean that the play failed with the audience, but modern critics allow the possibility that the play was pulled from performance for censorship or legal reasons.

== Macbeth ==
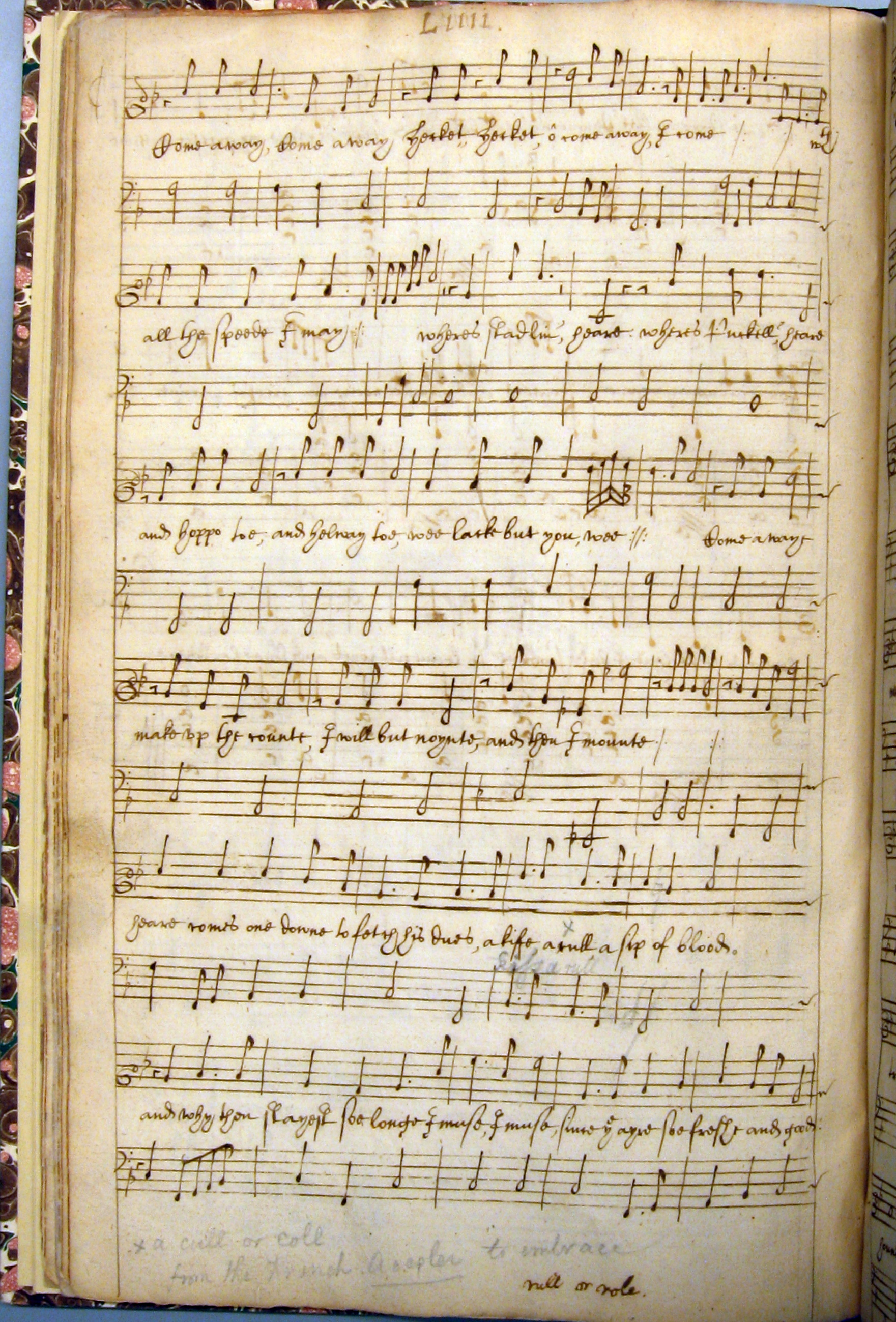
"Come away, come away", text by Middleton, music attributed to Robert Johnson as it appears in Drexel 4175

Two songs, "Come away, come away" and "Black spirits", occur in both The Witch and William Shakespeare's Macbeth. Middleton's play gives the full lyrics, whereas Macbeth only mentions the song titles in stage cues. Many scholars agree that the songs were interpolated into Macbeth during the printing of the First Folio.

== Witches ==
Middleton's primary source for material on witches was the Discovery of Witchcraft of Reginald Scot (1584), from which the playwright drew invocations, demons' names, and potion ingredients. Middleton, however, ignores Scot's skeptical attitude toward witchcraft lore, and merely mines his book for exploitable elements. He also borrowed the situation of a historical Duke and Duchess of Ravenna, related in the Florentine History of Niccolò Machiavelli and in the fiction of Matteo Bandello.

Witchcraft was a topical subject in the era Middleton wrote, and was the subject of other works like The Witch of Edmonton and The Late Lancashire Witches. Middleton's chief witch is a 120-year-old practitioner called Hecate. Her magic adheres to the Classical standard of Seneca's Medea; she specializes in love and sex magic, giving one character a charm to cause impotence. (In forming this aspect of the play's plot, Middleton may have been influenced by the contemporaneous real-life divorce scandal of Lady Frances Howard and the Earl of Essex, which involved charges of magic-induced impotence.)

Middleton's Hecate has a son (and incestuous lover) called Firestone, who serves as the play's clown. She leads a coven of four other witches, Stadlin, Hoppo, Hellwain, and Puckle. The occult material in The Witch occurs in only three scenes:

- Act I, scene ii introduces the coven and contains abundant witchcraft exotica, to establish the macabre mood — fried rats and pickled spiders, the flesh of an "unbaptized brat," a cauldron boiling over a blue flame, "Urchins, elves, hags, satyrs, Pans, fawns...Tritons, centaurs, dwarfs, imps...", "the blood of a flittermouse [bat]," and much much more. At one point, a cat enters playing a fiddle (a role filled by a musician in feline costume).
- Act III, scene iii features the song "Come away" that was added to Macbeth, and deals with the witches' flight through the air: at one point "A Spirit descends in the shape of a Cat," and Hecate is shown "Ascending with the Spirit."
- Act V, scene ii contains the song "Black spirits," also inserted into Macbeth.

Middleton's witches "are lecherous, murderous and perverse in the traditional demonological way, but they are also funny, vulnerable and uncomfortably necessary to the maintenance of state power and social position by those who resort to them." Middleton's choice to set the play in Italy may reflect an element of satire against witchcraft beliefs and practices in Roman Catholic societies of his era.

== Characters ==
- Duke
- Lord Governor
- Sebastian, contracted to Isabella
- Fernando, his friend
- Antonio, husband to Isabella
- Aberzanes, a gentleman, neither honest, wise, nor valiant
- Almachildes, a fantastical gentleman
- Gaspero and Hermio, servants to Antonio
- Firestone, the clown and Hecate's son
- Boy
- Duchess (named Amoretta, like her servant)
- Isabella, niece to the governor (and wife to Antonio)
- Francisca, Antonio's sister
- Amoretta, the duchess's woman
- Florida, a courtesan
- An old woman
- Hecate, the chief witch
- Five other witches, including Stadlin, Hoppo, Puckle and Hellwain
- Malkin, a spirit like a cat

== Synopsis ==
=== Act I ===
Scene 1: Urbino, Italy; The grounds of the Lord Governor's house; the day of Antonio and Isabella's wedding; a banquet laid out

Sebastian has been absent from Urbino for three years, and has falsely been reported killed in war. His fiancee Isabella has just married the powerful aristocrat Antonio. According to the Renaissance custom of handfast, Sebastian regards Isabella as his wife in the sight of Heaven. Sebastian is distraught at the thought of Isabella consummating her marriage with Antonio that night. Antonio's courtesan Florida enters, upset that Antonio has married another woman. Antonio's servant Gaspero assures her that Antonio will return to her after he has grown tired of his new wife. Almachildes, "a fantastical gentleman," enters and flirts with Amoretta, a lady-in-waiting, but she resists. Almachildes decides to go to "the witches" to procure a charm to make Amoretta fall in love with him. The wedding party, including the Duke, the Duchess, Antonio, and Isabella, enters. The Duke has a goblet made from the skull of his wife's father (a defeated enemy) and uses it to make toasts. The Duchess is disgusted, but conceals her disdain. In an aside, she says that she has already decided upon her revenge.

Scene 2: Hecate's cave

Hecate, the chief witch, enters carrying serpents and an "unbaptized brat." The witches plan to boil the baby and use its fat to make a transvection ointment that enables them to fly at night, transform themselves into incubi, and have sex with young men. Sebastian enters and asks Hecate to make Antonio impotent. Hecate gives him a charm made from the skins of lizards and snakes. Sebastian leaves. Almachildes enters, very drunk. He gives Hecate a toad and asks her for a love charm for Amoretta. She obliges, giving him a charm that will make Amoretta instantly fall in love with him, provided it is touching her body. Pleased with the toad, Hecate invites Almachildes to dinner. A cat playing a fiddle (Malkin) enters, followed by spirits bearing plates of fine meat.

=== Act II ===
Scene 1: Antonio's house; the morning after the wedding

Antonio is extremely glum because Hecate's charm made him impotent on his wedding night. Francisca (Antonio's younger sister) enters. Left alone on stage, she reveals that she has been receiving secret nighttime visits from Aberzanes, and is now heavily pregnant. She worries that Antonio will kill her if the pregnancy is discovered. Isabella enters, not knowing of the pregnancy, and encourages Francisca to get married so she can discuss matters of a marital nature with her (Antonio's impotency is obviously on her mind). Antonio enters and Isabella sings a song for him; the lyrics of the song slyly allude to the plights of Isabella, Amoretta and Francisca. Aberzanes ("a gentleman, neither honest, wise nor valiant") enters. Francisca takes him aside and asks what they should do about her pregnancy. Aberzanes assures her that he has a plan. Sebastian enters disguised as a servant, "Celio." Isabella introduces "Celio" (not knowing he is actually Sebastian) and says that she has just hired him that very morning. "Celio" announces the arrival of a letter from Antonio's mother in Northern Italy, asking Francisca to come immediately. (The letter is in fact a forgery by Aberzanes; this is his way of getting Francisca out of the house so she can give birth in secret.) Antonio orders Francisca to go to Northern Italy at once. Left alone on stage, Sebastian deduces from Antonio's glum demeanor that Hecate's charm worked. He is pleased, but even more desperate than before to get Isabella back. At the end of the scene, Gaspero enters with the Lord Governor (Isabella's uncle), who has come to pay Antonio a visit.

Scene 2: The Duke's palace

Almachildes regretfully recalls his drunken dinner with the witches. He discovers Hecate's charm in his pocket and decides to try it out. Amoretta enters. Almachildes embraces her and slips the charm into the bodice of her dress. Amoretta pushes Almachildes away; he exits. Then the charm begins to work: Amoretta has a sudden change of heart and declares that Almachildes is "the sweetest gentleman in court." She also reveals that the Duchess has ordered her to get close to Almachildes so he can be used in an undisclosed "employment." Amoretta says she was initially averse to this, but she now looks forward to the task with great relish. The Duchess enters and asks Amoretta if she has arranged with Almachildes yet. Amoretta says that she could never do anything to deceive Almachildes, but declares her willingness to become his honest wife. The Duchess wonders if Amoretta has lost her mind. The charm falls from Amoretta's dress to the floor, and the Duchess (whose name, conveniently, is also Amoretta) picks it up, thereby transferring the love spell from Amoretta to the Duchess. Amoretta immediately declares her complete hatred for Almachildes; the Duchess declares her love for him. Amoretta agrees to deceive Almachildes. The Duchess looks forward to tasting the sweetness of revenge and love combined; she exits. Almachildes enters. Amoretta flirts with him and promises to meet him soon. Almachildes assumes that Hecate's charm has done its trick.

Scene 3: A farmhouse

Francisca has had her baby. Aberzanes pays an old woman for her help delivering the baby, then leaves it on the doorstep of his friend, a tailor, after giving a speech about how the tailor once suggested doing exactly that. Aberzanes and Francisca prepare to return to Urbino. Francisca examines her reflection in a mirror. She is surprised to see how pale and thin she has grown.

=== Act III ===
Scene 1: The Duke's palace

The Duchess has tricked Almachildes into having sex with her by blindfolding him and pretending to be Amoretta. The scene begins as she removes the blindfold. She tells Almachildes that she will marry him if he helps her kill the Duke, but threatens to accuse him of rape if he refuses. Almachildes agrees to help her kill the Duke.

Scene 2: The grounds of Antonio's house

Gaspero helps Florida sneak into the house for a rendezvous with Antonio. Sebastian (disguised as "Celio") sees Florida heading off to Antonio's bedroom. Gaspero tells "Celio" that Florida is Antonio's mistress, and that she has visited the house three times in the past ten days (it seems that Hecate's impotency charm only impedes Antonio's ability to have sex with Isabella). Alone onstage, Isabella says she has found a letter that reveals the details of Francisca's affair with Aberzanes. Aberzanes and Francisca enter, supposedly having just returned from Northern Italy. Isabella confronts Francisca with the letter and insists that she leave Antonio's house immediately. In a soliloquy, Francisca decides to protect herself against exposure by spreading lies about Isabella. Francisca tells Antonio that Isabella has been having an affair with Gaspero. Antonio believes her, and decides to try to catch Isabella in the act of cheating on him. "Celio" tells Isabella about Antonio's relationship with Florida. Isabella, who has become dissatisfied with her impotent husband, promises to reward "Celio" handsomely if he can prove that his allegations against Antonio are true. "Celio" says that he can sneak Isabella out of the house and they will catch Antonio cheating on her.

Scene 3: A forest glade

Hecate, Hoppo and Stadlin prepare for a nighttime flight. Hoppo and Stadlin take off. Voices from offstage bid Hecate to hurry up and join the nighttime flight, and sing the song "Come Away, Come Away" (which also appears in Macbeth). A "Spirit like a cat" (Malkin) descends as the voices sing. Hecate ascends with the Cat, extolling the expected pleasures of her nighttime ride.

=== Act IV ===
Scene 1: The Duke's palace

In a soliloquy, Almachildes reveals that he has helped the Duchess kill the Duke; but the Duchess's rule is unpopular and an uprising has broken out. Almachildes regrets his role in the Duke's murder and worries that he will become the Duchess' next victim. The Duchess enters and tells Almachildes that she is afraid for his safety. She advises him to lie low for a while and promises to marry him as soon as public sentiment cools down. Almachildes agrees to follow the Duchess' advice, but is privately skeptical of her intentions. In a short soliloquy, the Duchess says she plans to kill Almachildes so that he will not reveal her complicity in the Duke's murder. The Lord Governor enters. The Duchess promises him her love if he will intervene to calm the insurrection. The Lord Governor agrees.

Scene 2: Fernando's house

Sebastian tells Florida and Fernando about his convoluted scheme to lure Isabella into bed and deflower her. Posing as "Celio," Sebastian has told Isabella to go to Fernando's house (a sort-of brothel where Florida has a room) and pose as Florida in an attempt to attain proof of Antonio's adultery. Then, Sebastian will pose as Antonio, go to Florida's room, and have sex with Isabella. Meanwhile, Florida will be at Antonio's house, having sex with him there. Fernando and Florida agree to Sebastian's plan. Florida leaves to go to Antonio's.

Isabella knocks at the door of Fernando's house. Sebastian exits to an adjoining room. Fernando agrees to show Isabella to Florida's room. Isabella curses Antonio and says she would have never found herself in such a miserable situation if her first husband (Sebastian) had lived. Isabella and Fernando exit. Sebastian enters. Moved by Isabella's remembrance of him, he decides that it would be wrong to deceive her. Isabella enters and accuses "Celio" of deceiving her because Antonio was not in Florida's bedroom. "Celio" encourages Isabella to wait; he is reluctant to send her back home for fear she will discover Florida in her bed.

Scene 3: Antonio's house

Francisca expects Antonio to arrive home shortly, and is scheming to have him catch Gaspero and Isabella in bed together. Francisca calls for Gaspero, who enters undressed. Francisca says that Isabella has been calling for help, but none of her ladies-in-waiting have gone to her aid (Francisca drugged all of the ladies to make sure they would stay asleep). She urges Gaspero to go to Isabella's room immediately. Gaspero says that he has to get dressed first but Francisca tells him not to bother. Gaspero goes to Isabella's room. Antonio arrives and Francisca encourages him to search Gaspero's room. Antonio complies, and finds the room empty. Convinced that Gaspero must be sleeping with Isabella, Antonio draws his sword and heads to Isabella's room. He returns with a bloody sword, claiming to have stabbed Gaspero and Isabella (not realizing that "Isabella" was really Florida). Raving, he shouts that he will kill Francisca too, because she was the person who brought him the news of Isabella's adultery and made him a murderer. Fearing for her life, Francisca admits that she made the entire story up to conceal the illegitimate child she had with Aberzanes. This revelation stuns Antonio and plunges him into an even deeper grief. He puts his sword down and sends a servant to fetch Aberzanes.

=== Act V ===
Scene 1: Antonio's house

Aberzanes arrives at Antonio's house. Antonio urges him to draw his sword and fight, but Aberzanes refuses. Antonio forces Francisca and Aberzanes to kneel and perform a handfast (engagement) ceremony, ending by making them drink some poisoned wine. He also drinks the wine himself—a suicidal act that is not in fact suicidal because the servant, Hermio, disobeyed Antonio's orders and refrained from poisoning the wine. In a soliloquy, Antonio wonders if his ruined marriage might be retribution for spreading false reports of Sebastian's death so he could marry Isabella. A servant enters and reports that Gaspero and "Isabella" are merely wounded, not dead. Gaspero enters and tells Antonio that the woman in his room was Florida, not Isabella. Assuming that Isabella is out having sex with another man, Antonio prays that the poisoned wine will not take effect until he can find his wife and kill her. Hermio tells him that the wine wasn't actually poisoned. The Lord Governor enters. Antonio tells the Lord Governor that his niece Isabella is an "impudent adulteress." The Lord Governor demands proof. Florida enters and says that Isabella is sleeping with her servant "Celio" at Fernando's house. Antonio rushes off to Fernando's house in a rage. Isabella and "Celio" return to the house. Hermio tells them that there has been a great deal of commotion as a result of Isabella's absence and that Antonio has gone to Fernando's house to find her. Isabella blames "Celio" for staining her reputation. Sebastian worries that his foolhardy scheme has caused Isabella's ruin.

Scene 2: Hecate's cave, a cauldron set

The Duchess goes to Hecate to procure poison for Almachildes. Hecate offers her a portrait of Almachildes that will kill him within a month. The Duchess rejects it because it would take too long. Hecate recites a charm in Latin (quoted from Ovid) and assures the Duchess that Almachildes will die that evening. The Duchess exits. Hecate orders Firestone to bring her various ingredients, including "three ounces of the red-haired girl I killed last midnight." These ingredients are stirred together in a pot; Hecate sings a charm song and the other witches perform a dance for the moon.

Scene 3: Antonio's house

Isabella explains her absence to the Lord Governor. He scolds "Celio" for providing Isabella with false information and leading her into a compromising situation. Hermio enters and announces that Antonio fell through a trap door to his death while searching Fernando's house for Isabella. Florida faints; some servants carry her away. The Lord Governor continues to scold "Celio." "Celio" removes his disguise to reveal that he is actually Sebastian. Isabella expresses joyous disbelief and the Lord Governor welcomes him happily. Gaspero admits that Antonio paid him to give false reports of Sebastian's death. The Duchess enters. The Lord Governor reveals the body of the Duke (it has presumably been concealed in a curtained-off space up to this point) and charges the Duchess with adultery and murder. The Duchess admits to the murder, but denies the adultery. The Lord Governor calls for Almachildes. Almachildes enters and confesses that he had sex with the Duchess while blindfolded. Amoretta enters and testifies that the woman Almachildes slept with while blindfolded was actually a hired prostitute, not the Duchess. The Duchess is thus cleared of the adultery charge, but the murder charge still stands. At that moment, to everyone's great surprise, the Duke sits up from his death bed, perfectly alive (it seems as though Almachildes was not cold-blooded enough to actually kill him). The Duchess is thus cleared of all charges. The Duke is in a very forgiving mood. He thanks Almachildes for sparing his life, pardons his wife's transgressions, and promises to refrain from drinking out of the skull goblet in the future. The play ends on a note of festivity and redemption.

== See also ==
- Drexel 4175
