= The Masque of the Inner Temple and Gray's Inn =

Play written by Francis Beaumont

The Masque of the Inner Temple and Gray's Inn, also known as The Masque of the Olympic Knights, is an English masque created in the Jacobean period. It was written by Francis Beaumont and is known to have been performed on 20 February 1613 in the Banqueting House at Whitehall Palace, as part of the elaborate wedding festivities surrounding the marriage of Princess Elizabeth, the daughter of King James I, to Frederick V, Elector Palatine.

== The show ==
The masque was preceded by a procession, in which the masquers came down the River Thames from Winchester House on the royal barge, accompanied by a flotilla of other barges and boats, on Shrove Tuesday, 16 February. The masque itself was scheduled to be staged that evening, but had to be postponed for four days, due to the press of crowds at the Banqueting House and the fatigue of the King. John Chamberlain thought that the masque was spoiled by the delay, since the surprise value of the costumes and set had been lost. The King enjoyed it when he saw it, and ordered the dances repeated.

The principal masquers were fifteen knights of Olympia, dressed in carnation costumes; the musicians were costumed as twelve priests of Jove. The masque is richly dependent upon Greek mythology: the presenters were Mercury and Iris, the dancers of the first anti-masque were Naiads, Hyades and Cupids, joined by statues forged by Vulcan for Mount Olympus that came alive (four each of Naiads, Hyades, and statues, and five Cupids). The second anti-masque was a dance of rustic figures in "country sports." This second anti-masque was reproduced in a slightly simplified form in The Two Noble Kinsmen later in 1613, a sign of the influence that masques had on the stage drama of the era. (See Oberon, the Faery Prince for its similar connection with The Winter's Tale.)

== Sponsorship ==
The masque was sponsored by two of the four Inns of Court. (The other two inns sponsored a wedding tribute of their own, The Memorable Masque of the Middle Temple and Lincoln's Inn, by George Chapman.) Inns of Court records reveal that the Inner Temple paid over £1200 for its half of the costs of the masque; the bill for Gray's Inn must have been comparable. The Inner Temple charged its members assessments of £1 or £2 to help pay the cost; charges at Gray's Inn ranged from £1 to £4. The costumes for the masquers cost £60 per man. George Radcliffe, a student at Gray's Inn, wrote to his parents to help pay his £4.

== Publication ==
Beaumont's masque was entered into the Stationers' Register on 27 February 1613 and published soon after in an undated quarto by the bookseller George Norton. Norton issued a second quarto edition, also undated, sometime later. Beaumont dedicated the work to Sir Francis Bacon, who had organized the show for the Inns of Court. The masque was reprinted in the first Beaumont and Fletcher folio in 1647, and in a collection of Beaumont and Fletcher poems published in 1653 and reprinted in 1660, and in the second Beaumont and Fletcher folio of 1679. The title page of the first edition attributed the masque to Beaumont alone – a verdict with which modern scholars agree. The quarto and folio texts are not identical; the quarto is much fuller in its descriptions of the action of the masque.

== Music ==
Some of the music for the masque has survived – two dances by Giovanni Coperario; these were published by Andrew Sabol in his Songs and Dances for the Stuart Masque (1959).
