= George Montaigne =

Archbishop of York in 1628

The Most Reverend George Montaigne
- Archbishop of York
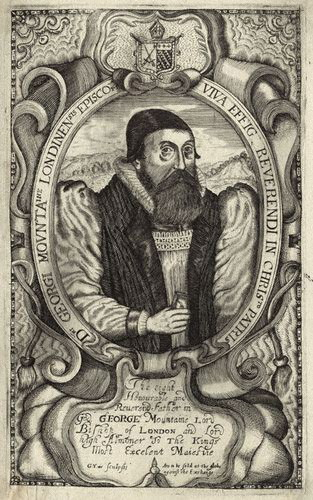
- George Montaigne during his time as Bishop of London.
- Church: Church of England
- Diocese: York
- Installed: July 1628
- Term ended: 24 October 1628
- Predecessor: Tobias Matthew
- Successor: Samuel Harsnett

Orders
- Ordination: 28 June 1593 by Richard Howland
- Consecration: 14 December 1617 by George Abbot

Personal details
- Born: 1569 Cawood, Yorkshire
- Died: 24 October 1628 (aged 58–59) London
- Buried: All Saints' Church, Cawood
- Denomination: Anglican

Ordination history of George Montaigne
History
Diaconal ordination
- Ordained by: Richard Howland
- Date: 28 June 1593
- Place: Peterborough
Priestly ordination
- Ordained by: Richard Howland
- Date: 28 June 1593
- Place: Peterborough
Episcopal consecration
- Principal consecrator: George Abbot
- Co-consecrators: Marco Antonio de Dominis; John King; Lancelot Andrewes; John Buckeridge; John Overall
- Date: 14 December 1617
- Place: Lambeth

George Montaigne (or Mountain; 1569 – 24 October 1628) was an English bishop.

== Life ==
Montaigne was born in 1569 at Cawood, Yorkshire. He was educated at Queens' College, Cambridge, matriculating at Michaelmas 1586, graduating B.A. 1590, M.A. 1593, B.D. 1602, D.D. 1607, and holding a fellowship at Queens' 1592–1611. He was ordained deacon and priest at Peterborough in 1593.

In 1597 he was chaplain to Robert Devereux, 2nd Earl of Essex, on his expedition against Cádiz. He became rector of Great Cressingham in 1602. He was Gresham College Professor of Divinity in 1607, and in 1608 Master of the Savoy and chaplain to James VI and I.

He was Dean of Westminster in 1610. He was appointed Bishop of Lincoln in 1617 and was consecrated on 14 December that year by Archbishop George Abbot, and co-consecrated by the Roman Catholic Archbishop of Split Marco Antonio de Dominis. He was appointed Lord High Almoner in 1619, Bishop of London in 1621 and Bishop of Durham in 1627.

When in 1628 the archbishopric of York fell vacant by the death of Tobias Matthew, Montaigne is said to have secured the nomination by remarking to Charles I, "Hadst thou faith as a grain of mustard seed, thou wouldst say unto this mountain, be removed into that sea [see]" (Matthew 17:20). He was duly elected to the archbishopric on 1 July, but died in London on 24 October 1628, and was buried in Cawood Church.

He was one of the Arminian group of bishops who arose in opposition to the general Calvinism that prevailed in the Church of England in the early seventeenth century. One manifestation of his views were prosecutions in his London diocese for the disrespectful wearing of hats in services.

== Arms ==
Coat of arms of George Montaigne
Notes While serving as a bishop Montaigne's arms would be displayed impaled with the arms of the diocese and topped by a mitre. Escutcheon Barry lozengy Or and Azure on a chief Gules three crosslets of the first.

== Notes and references ==
Academic offices
Preceded by William Dakins	Gresham Professor of Divinity; 1607–1610	Succeeded by William Osbaldeston
Church of England titles
Preceded by Richard Neile	Dean of Westminster; 1610–1617	Succeeded by Robert Tounson
Preceded by Richard Neile	Bishop of Lincoln; 1617–1621	Succeeded by John Williams
Preceded by John King	Bishop of London; 1621–1627	Succeeded by William Laud
Preceded by Richard Neile	Bishop of Durham; 1627–1628	Succeeded by John Howson
Preceded by Tobias Matthew	Archbishop of York; 1628	Succeeded by Samuel Harsnett
