= George Radcliffe (politician) =

English lawyer and politician

Sir George Radcliffe (1599 – May 1657) was an English lawyer and politician. He spent much of his political career in Ireland, where he was a key member of the firm and ruthless Strafford administration. He lived out his last years in exile in the Dutch Republic.

== Early career ==
Born the son of Nicholas Radcliffe (d. 1599) of Overthorpe, West Yorkshire and his wife Margaret Marsh, widow of John Bayley, Radcliffe was educated at Oldham and at University College, Oxford. As a student lawyer at Gray's Inn in 1613, Radcliffe was asked to contribute to the costs of masques at the wedding of Princess Elizabeth and Frederick V of the Palatinate.

He attained some measure of success as a barrister, and about 1626 became the confidential adviser of Sir Thomas Wentworth, afterwards Earl of Strafford, who was related to his wife, Anne Trappes (died 1659). Strafford was a man with a gift for making enemies, but Radcliffe remained his devoted friend for life. Strafford's biographer notes that "in all the crises of his life it was to Radcliffe that he opened his heart".

Like his master, he was imprisoned in 1627 for declining to contribute to a forced loan, but he shared the good, as well as the ill, fortunes of Wentworth, acting as his adviser when he was president of the Council of the North.

== In Ireland ==
When Wentworth was made Lord Deputy of Ireland, Radcliffe, in January 1633, preceded him to that country, and having been made a member of the Privy Council of Ireland he was trusted by the Deputy in the fullest possible way, his advice being of the greatest service. Wentworth wrote that of all the Privy Council, he confided only in Radcliffe and Christopher Wandesford, whose services to him could never be adequately rewarded. It was Radcliffe who persuaded Strafford to mend an early quarrel with James Butler, 1st Duke of Ormonde, arguing rightly that Ormonde would be a friend and ally of immense value.

On the other hand, he and Strafford showed very poor judgement in their campaign of harassment against the powerful magnate Richard Boyle, 1st Earl of Cork, who became an implacable enemy of Strafford, and worked patiently over the years for his ruin.

Radcliffe sat in the Irish House of Commons as member for County Armagh in the Parliament of 1634–35 and for County Sligo in the Parliament of 1639–41, and was farmer of the customs revenues. He also acquired substantial lands in County Fermanagh and County Sligo. When Strafford returned to England in 1639, he entrusted Radcliffe with the management of Ireland's finances and also Strafford's own tangled financial affairs. Radcliffe built Rathmines Castle near Dublin: it was destroyed during the wars of the following decade but rebuilt in the eighteenth century.

In 1640, Radcliffe, like Strafford, was arrested and impeached, but the charges against him were not pressed. He was freed in 1642, and in 1643 he was with Charles I at Oxford. He remained loyal to Strafford's family, and used his extensive knowledge of his master's financial affairs to salvage something for his widow and children.

== Exile ==
In 1647 he fled to France, and joined the Court in exile. His association with Strafford, now seen as a martyr for the Royalist cause, made him a figure of some importance, and he became a confidential adviser to the future James II. Unfortunately, he was drawn into James's quarrels with his mother Henrietta Maria and his brother Charles II, and for a time Charles declared him persona non grata. Through Ormonde's goodwill, Radcliffe was eventually restored to favour, but had little influence in his last years. He wrote to his wife that he was "as weary as a dog of his office", and that only loyalty to James deterred him from retirement. He also complained, like many exiled Royalists, of his dire poverty, "not having had a new suit of clothes in five years". He died at Flushing in May 1657.

By his wife Anne, daughter of Sir Francis Trappes and Mary Atkinson, he had one son Thomas. Thomas regained the family estates in County Sligo at the Restoration of Charles II, but died without issue in Dublin in 1679. Anne died two years after her husband, and is buried in Westminster Abbey.

Radcliffe wrote An essay towards the life of my Lord Strafford, from which the material for the various lives of the statesman has been largely taken. His description of Strafford's much-loved second wife Arabella Holles has been described as "lyrical", and suggests that he had a romantic devotion to her memory.

== Character ==
Veronica Wedgwood describes him as a pious man of simple tastes, not outstandingly intelligent, but courageous, thorough and a skilled lawyer. On the other hand, he could be irritable, intolerant, and indiscreet.
