= William Osbaldeston =

Gresham Professor of Divinity (1577–1645)

William Osbaldeston or Osbolston (1577–1645) was Gresham Professor of Divinity at Gresham College, London, England.

== Life ==
He was the eldest son of Lambert Osbaldeston, haberdasher, of London, and brother of Lambert Osbaldeston, was born in 1577, and, after attending Westminster School, was elected from that school to Christ Church, Oxford, whence he matriculated in February 1597–8, graduating B.A. on 24 October 1601, M.A. on 24 July 1604, B.D. on 19 June 1611, and D.D. in May 1617. His name appears in the list of admissions to Gray's Inn on 1 August 1619.

He resided at Oxford for some years after taking his bachelor's degree, and contributed to the poems written at Christ Church on the visit of James I to that college in 1605. On 13 December 1610, he succeeded George Montaigne as divinity professor at Gresham College. This post he resigned in the following year; but in 1612, when desirous of returning to the college as rhetoric professor, he was unsuccessful in obtaining the post. In 1616, he became rector of Parndon Magna in Essex, and of East Hanningfield in the same county. He retained both livings until about December 1643, when he was deprived, and his benefices were sequestered by the House of Commons. He died early in 1645. A Robert Osbalston, supposed to be his son, was rector of Parndon Magna from 1662 to 1679.

Academic offices
Preceded by George Montaigne	Gresham Professor of Divinity; 1610–1612	Succeeded by Samuel Brooke
