= Hugh Gray (theologian) =

English churchman and academic

Hugh Gray (died 1604) was an English churchman and academic, and the second Gresham Professor of Divinity.

== Life ==
He matriculated as a sizar of Trinity College, Cambridge, in May 1574, was elected scholar, and in 1579 proceeded B.A. He was elected a fellow on 2 October 1581, and commenced M.A. in 1582. On 8 January 1587 he preached an inflammatory sermon at Great St. Mary's, Cambridge, against church music, gambling, "dumb dogs" and mercenary ministers, and the celebration of Christmas. For this sermon he was convened before the vice-chancellor and heads of colleges. He afterwards made a public explanation, denying the particular application of the passages excepted against.

He proceeded B.D. in 1589, was created D.D. in 1595, and was in December 1596 an unsuccessful candidate for the Lady Margaret Professorship of Divinity in his university, receiving twelve votes, while twenty-eight were recorded for Thomas Playfere. On 9 April 1597 he was elected a senior fellow of his college. On 5 November 1600 he was collated to the prebend of Milton Manor in the cathedral of Lincoln; he also held the rectory of Meon-Stoke in Hampshire.

Gray succeeded Anthony Wotton as Gresham professor of divinity, resigning before 6 July 1604. His death took place in the same month. He left money to Trinity College to build a pulpit, and to Gresham College a piece of plate to be in common among all the readers. The lectures which he had read at Gresham College he left to William Jackson, minister of St. Swithin's, London; they do not appear to have been printed.

Academic offices
Preceded by Anthony Wotton	Gresham Professor of Divinity; 1599–1604	Succeeded by William Dakins
