= There Is a Garden in Her Face =

1617 poem by Thomas Campion

There Is A Garden In Her Face is a lyric poem by Thomas Campion that was published in 1617.

== Introduction ==
As a contemporary of William Shakespeare, Thomas Campion (12 February 1567 – 1 March 1620) lived during an era of renaissance and was also recognized as a poet of "Elizabethan song-books"; a composer, musical and literary theorist, and a physician; producing a number of lute songs and masques during his time. First introduced in 1601, A Booke of Ayres (or lute-songs) began a four-part series of songbooks with words and music arranged by Campion himself, along with English composer and musician, Philip Rosseter.

The series not only solidified his reputation as a lyric poet, it also marked his first transition from writing Latin verse to English. Published in 1617 by the London firm of Thomas Snodham, three years before the poet's death, in The Third and Fourth Booke of Ayres, the lyric poet "tuned his music to the heart" with verse revealing his rhythmic and melodic abilities in "There is a Garden in Her Face," also known as "Cherry-Ripe." Multiple arrangements of his songs have since been produced and an arrangement of There is a Garden in Her Face can also be found with an audio recording, as well as sheet music by composers such as, Granville Bantock.

While Campion created with lute accompaniment in mind, the last song book in his series states on the cover: "so as they may be expressed by one voyce, with a violl, lute, or orpharion." There is another note to the reader in The Second Booke of Ayres (c.1613) written in Latin (in which Campion tends to write more of): "Omnia nec nostris bona sunt, sed nec mala libris; Sic placet hac cantes, hac quoque lege legas," translated in English as: "All things are not good by our own, the books of, but not both evil; Thus, in this thou mayest sing, please, to read the law to this matter, too."

The Third and Fourth Booke of Ayres, also begins with a note to the reader that entertains the idea that one cannot read the verse without recalling a tune: "some words are in these Bookes, which have been cloathed in Musicke by others, and I am content they then served their turne: yet give mee now leave to make use of mine owne...to be briefe, all these Songs are mine if you expresse them well, otherwise they are your owne," signed off with "yours as you are his, Thomas Campian" (Hart 63). "There is a Garden in Her Face" can also be found in English composers Robert Jones’ Ultimum Vale; and Richard Allison’s An Howres Recreation in Musicke.

== Text ==
There is a Garden in her face,
Where Roses and white Lilies grow;
A heav'nly paradice is that place,
Wherein all pleasant fruits doe flow.
There Cherries grow, which none may buy
Till Cherry ripe themselves doe cry.
Those Cherries fayrely doe enclose
Of Orient Pearle a double row,
Which when her lovely laughter showes,
They look like Rose-buds fill'd with snow.
Yet them nor Peere nor Prince can buy,
Till Cherry ripe themselves doe cry.
Her Eyes like Angels watch them still;
Her Browes like bended bowes doe stand,
Threatning with piercing frownes to kill
All that attempt with eye or hand
Those sacred Cherries to come nigh,
Till Cherry ripe themselves doe cry.

== Critical Analysis ==
Consisting of three, six line stanzas of iambic tetrameter with occasional exceptions, "There is a Garden in Her Face" is a lyric poem beginning with an ABABCC rhyme scheme. With notable imagery all throughout the work, Campion's poem begins by providing readers with a template of a woman's face. While he starts out with a larger concept, he goes into detail on the woman's features; using recurring symbols such as roses, white lilies, and cherries to further illustrate her appearance. The refrain "till cherry ripe! themselves do cry" (London street seller cry), implies a sense of urgency in the speaker's observation and possible attempt to gain the woman over, for himself. While the speaker does not clearly express an intention to court the woman, there are hints of hostility in response to her "hard to get" attitude. While readers will often find that Campion's usual subject matter involves the concept of a "heavenly beauty" as seen in his poems "Rose-Cheeked Laura," and "Your Faire Looks Inflame my Desire," his use of flowery language to describe women, contrast with the challenges in romantic pursuit that is also mentioned in "There is a Garden in Her Face."
