= William Dakins =

English academic and clergyman

William Dakins (died 1607) was an English academic and clergyman, Gresham Professor of Divinity and one of the translators of the King James Bible.

== Life ==
He is conjectured (Thompson Cooper in the Dictionary of National Biography) to have been the son of William Dakins, M.A., vicar of Ashwell, Hertfordshire. He was educated at Westminster School, whence he was elected in 1586 to a scholarship at Trinity College, Cambridge, where he proceeded B.A. in 1591. He became a minor fellow of Trinity on 3 October 1593, and a major fellow on 16 March 1594. In 1594 he commenced M.A., and in 1601 proceeded B.D.

He became Greek lecturer of his college (an annual office) on 2 October 1602, and vicar of Trumpington, Cambridgeshire, in 1603. On the resignation of Hugo Gray he was chosen to succeed him as professor of divinity in Gresham College, London, on 14 July 1604. He was recommended by the vice-chancellor and several heads of colleges in Cambridge, but also by some of the nobility and even by King James I himself; Christopher Hill comments that James was probably glad to have a "harmless academic" appointed, after the evangelical Anthony Wotton and Gray.

He was one of the learned men employed in the authorised translation of the Bible, a member of the Second Westminster Company, to which the epistles of St. Paul and the canonical epistles were assigned. In 1605 he resigned the vicarage of Trumpington, and on 2 October 1606 became junior dean of Trinity College. He died in February 1607.

== Notes ==
Academic offices
Preceded by Hugh Gray	Gresham Professor of Divinity; 1604–1607	Succeeded by George Montaigne
