= Gresham Professor of Divinity =

Chair at Gresham College, London

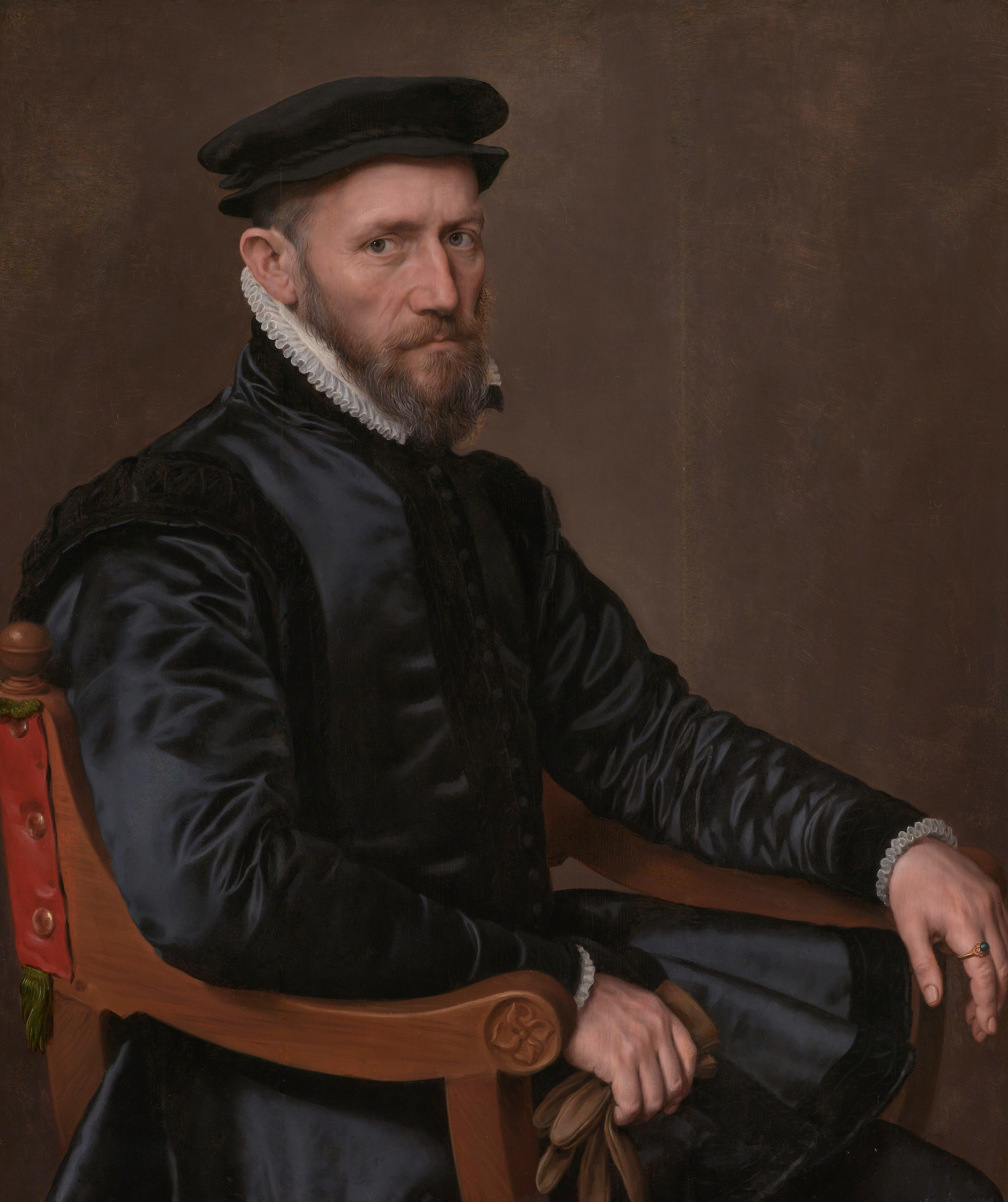
Thomas Gresham set out several professorships in his will

The Professor of Divinity at Gresham College, London, gives free educational lectures to the general public. The college was founded for this purpose in 1597, when it created seven professorships; this was later increased to ten. Divinity is one of the original professorships as set out by the will of Thomas Gresham in 1575.

The Professor of Divinity is appointed in partnership with the City of London Corporation.

== List of Gresham Professors of Divinity ==
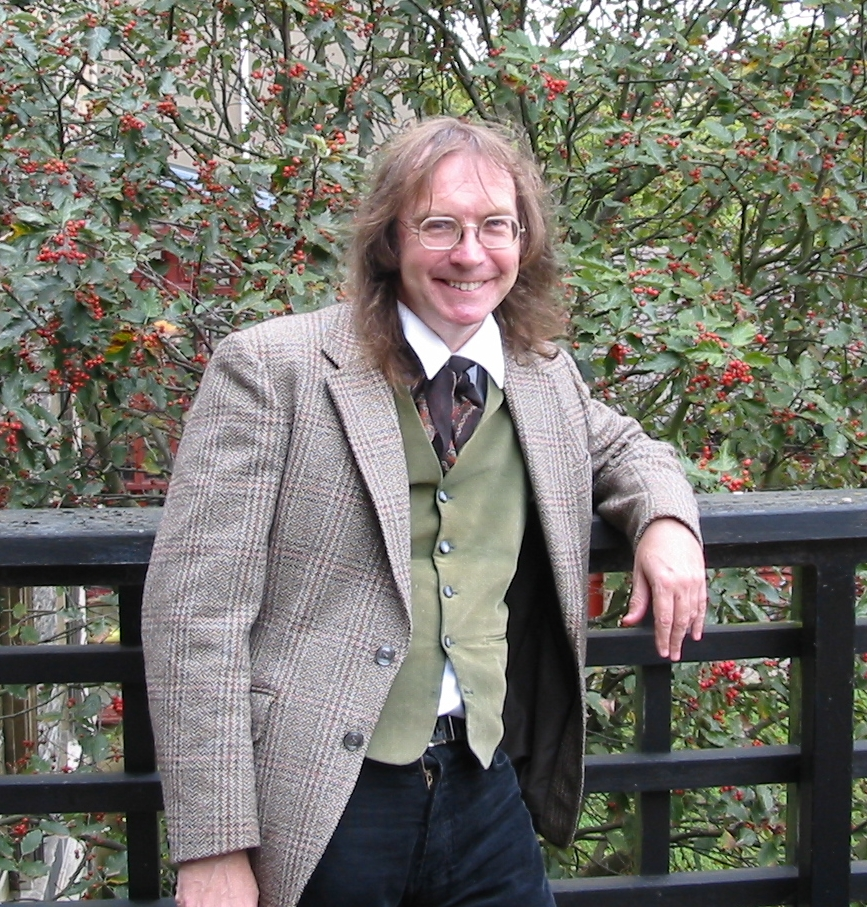
Ronald Hutton, appointed Gresham Professor of Divinity in 2022

| | Name | Started |
|---|---|---|
| 1 | Anthony Wotton | March 1596/97 |
| 2 | Hugo Gray | 1599 |
| 3 | William Dakins | 14 July 1604 |
| 4 | George Mountayne | 4 March 1606/07 |
| 5 | William Osbolston | 13 December 1610 |
| 6 | Samuel Brooke | 26 September 1612 |
| 7 | Richard Holdsworth | 28 November 1629 |
| 8 | Thomas Horton | 26 October 1641 |
| 9 | George Gifford | 7 June 1661 |
| 10 | Henry Wells | 2 July 1686 |
| 11 | Edward Lany | 31 July 1691 |
| 12 | John Bridgen | 25 September 1728 |
| 13 | B Halifax | 20 February 1760 |
| 14 | H J Parker | 7 February 1800 |
| 15 | John William Burgon | 11 December 1867 |
| 16 | H E J Bevan | 12 December 1888 |
| 17 | W H Thompson | 14 March 1904 |
1939–45 Lectures in abeyance
| 18 | Henry Martyn Sanders | 29 May 1946 |
| 19 | Oscar Hardman | 1957 |
| 20 | Gordon Huelin | 1962 |
| 21 | Gordon Phillips | 1967 |
| 22 | Gordon Reginald Dunstan | 1969 |
| 23 | Gordon Phillips | 1971 |
| 24 | Ulrich E Simon | 1973 |
| 25 | Viscount Combermere | 1975 |
| 26 | Richard Chartres, Bishop of London | 1987 |
| 27 | John Bowker | 1 September 1992 |
| 28 | Richard Holloway, Bishop of Edinburgh | 1 September 1997 |
| 29 | Gwen Griffith-Dickson | 1 September 2001 |
| 30 | Keith Ward | 1 September 2004 |
| 31 | Richard Harries, Lord Harries of Pentregarth | 1 September 2008 |
| 32 | Raymond Plant, Lord Plant of Highfield | 2012 |
| 33 | Alister McGrath | 2015 |
| 32 | Alec Ryrie | 2018 |
| 33 | Ronald Hutton | 2022 |
