= The Devil Is an Ass =

1616 comedy by Ben Jonson

The Devil Is an Ass is a Jacobean comedy by Ben Jonson, first performed in 1616, first published in 1631, and based on the events of the famous Leicester Boy Witch Trial.

The Devil Is an Ass followed Bartholomew Fair (1614), one of the author's greatest works, and marks the start of the final phase of his dramatic career.

== Performance and publication ==
The 1616 production was by the King's Men; the play probably received its première at the Blackfriars Theatre in October or November of the year. Robert Johnson composed music for the play.

The initial publication of the play was somewhat irregular, in that Jonson intended to include it in a second folio collection of his works in 1631, but scrapped the plan when he was dissatisfied with the printing. Copies of the 1631 printed text were released, though whether they were sold publicly or circulated privately by Jonson is unclear. The play was included in the eventual second folio of Jonson's works (1640–1), published after his death in 1637, and also was issued in a separate "variant reprint edition" in 1641.

== Synopsis ==
The play opens in Hell, with Satan and an inferior devil named Pug. Pug wants to be sent to Earth to do the Devil's work of tempting men to evil – but Satan thinks he isn't up to the job; the world has grown so sophisticated in its vices, especially in the moral cesspool of London, that a simple devil like Pug will be severely out of his depth. Pug pleads his case, however, and Satan sends him into the world, specifically to plague an eccentric and foolish gentleman named Fabian Fitzdottrel.

Fitzdottrel is obsessed with the idea of meeting a devil; he has consorted with magicians and conjurers (Simon Forman among others) in hopes of encountering an imp who will aid him in the discovery of buried treasure. In addition to his main mania, Fitzdottrel has subsidiary obsessions: he dresses his beautiful young wife sumptuously, but clothes himself in second-hand garments, which he wheels and deals over with enthusiasm. In the play's first Act he is enthusiastic about a fancy cloak that he plans to wear to the Blackfriars Theatre to see a play. Pug comes to him in the body of a thief who'd been hanged earlier in the morning; Fitzdottrel refuses to believe that Pug is a devil, since the corpse's feet are not cloven hooves—but Pug's claim that his name is "Devil" (or "Deville") is enough to earn him a place as a servant in Fitzdottrel's household.

His reputation for eccentric foolishness has made Fitzdottrel the target of a host of confidence men, who fall out into two groups: on the one hand, the young gallant Wittipol and his friend Manly, and on the other the "projector" Merecraft and his henchmen, Ingine the broker, Lady Tailbush, Guilthead the goldsmith, Everill and Train and others. Merecraft is after Fitzdottrel's money, while Wittipol is more interested in the man's wife. In exchange for a sumptuous cloak, Wittipol actually negotiates fifteen minutes of conversation with Mistress Frances Fitzdottrel, in her husband's presence. Fitzdottrel tries to outwit the gallant by ordering his wife to remain silent; but when Wittipol finds that the young woman will not answer him, he answers for her, so aptly that the virtuous Mistress Fitzdottrel is impressed, almost against her will, with his "brain and spirit."

Meanwhile, Merecraft is making progress with his intended mark by tempting Fitzdottrel with various get-rich-quick schemes, like raising "drowned land," harvesting dogs' skins, or making wine from raisins. Fitzdottrel is most enthusiastic about the first, and Merecraft convinces his dupe that he will soon be elevated to the peerage as the Duke of the Drowned Lands. (Reclaiming swamps and fens for agricultural use, via dykes and windmill-driven pumps, was a real and lucrative development of the time.) To train Mistress Fitzdottrel in the manners of the upper class, Merecraft persuades his victim to solicit, with a present of a diamond ring, the aid of an Englishwoman who has lived in Spain and is fluent in courtly manners. The "Spanish woman" will actually be a Merecraft henchman in disguise.

Pug, looking for opportunities for villainy, tries to tempt Mistress Fitzdottrel into cheating on her husband with Wittipol; but his effort is inept, and she thinks he is a spy planted by her husband. She denounces Pug to Fitzdottrel, who beats the imp with a cudgel. Wittipol manages to obtain a window-to-window conversation with her—but her husband finds out about it and seeks to guard her even more closely than usual. He is still entranced by Merecraft's con-game, however, and the central scenes in the play spin out a complex web of manipulation that includes rounds of Who's got the cloak? and Who's got the ring?, and a wealth of satirical commentary on various aspects of London life, such as the booming business of women's cosmetics. Wittipol wins the role of the Spanish woman, and in this disguise he penetrates Fitzdottrel's watch to reach his wife.

Mistress Fitzdottrel, however, surprises Wittipol and Manly with an effective plea to their nobler natures (Act IV, scene vi). Appealing to Wittipol to put his "noble parts" that have impressed her "To a right use," she seeks his aid in resolving her dilemma:

...I am a Woman

That cannot speak more wretchedness of myself,
Than you can read: match'd to a mass of folly,
That every day makes haste to his own ruin;
The wealthy portion that I brought him, spent:
And (through my friends' neglect) no jointure made me.
My fortunes standing in this precipice,
'Tis counsel that I want, and honest aids;
And in this name I need you for a friend,
Never in any other; for his ill
Must not make me, Sir, worse.

Influenced by Manly and his own better nature, Wittipol puts aside his lustful quest to help Mistress Fitzdottrel out of her difficulties. To this point, Wittipol and Manly have been co-operating with Merecraft and company, but now, in effect, they change sides. Merecraft has by this time tricked Fitzdottrel into signing over all his fortune to his wife, with Merecraft himself as the intended guardian; Wittipol and Manly manage to switch the guardianship to Manly at the last moment. Once she has legal control of their estate, Mistress Fitzdottrel can prevent her husband's follies from bankrupting them.

Merecraft, now realising that he's been fooled, strikes back: he persuades Fitzdottrel (who is outraged at his wife's usurpation of authority) to pretend to be bewitched by his wife and her confederates. In the sympathetic court of Sir Paul Eitherside, Merecraft plans to get the legal documents dismissed and restore Fitzdottrel to the control of his own estate, so the cheating can continue.

Pug has not done well through all these developments: beaten, manipulated, and generally abused, he ends up confined to Newgate Prison at the end of the day. (Jonson, true to the Aristotelian unities of time and place, stages all this action in a single day.) Pug appeals to Satan to take him back to Hell with whatever punishment the lord of the underworld chooses—for nothing in hell compares "to a lady of fashion." Satan, triumphant in his prediction that 1616 London was more than Pug could handle, arrives to spirit Pug away, blasting a wall out of Newgate in the process, and leaving the thief's body behind. And the jailers realise, belatedly, that the man they'd arrested in the afternoon was the same man they'd hanged in the morning.

Merecraft's trial before Sir Paul is warming up, with Fitzdottrel giving a bravura performance as a bewitched victim. But word arrives of the satanic doings at Newgate; and Fitzdottrel, realising that Pug, "Deville," had been a devil after all, is so beside himself that he abandons the pretense of bewitchment and spills the beans. In the end, the con men are themselves conned, the witty enjoy the fruits of their wit, and virtue is preserved.

== See also ==
- 1616 in literature
