= Thomas Campion =

English composer and poet (1567–1620)

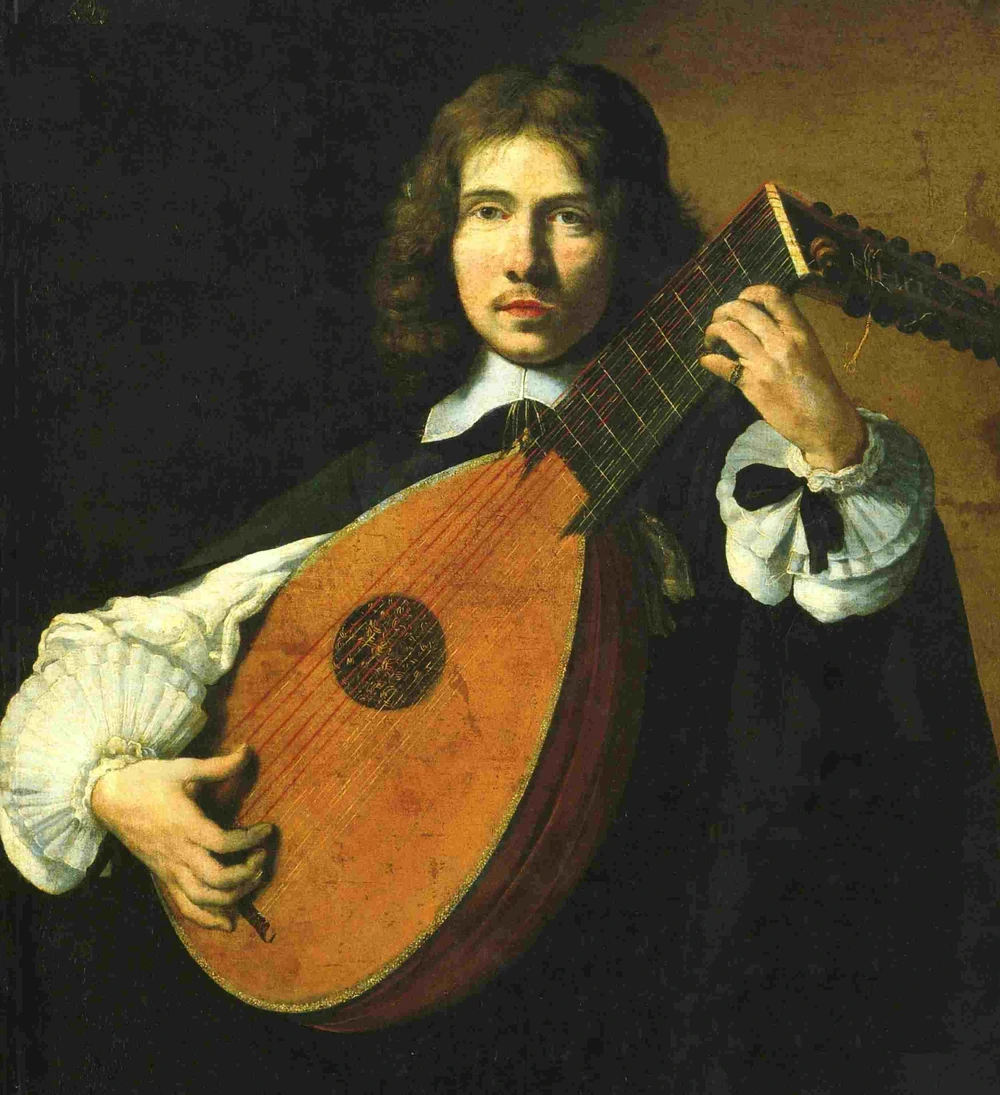
Anonymous, Lute-player, thought to be Thomas Campion (17th century)

Thomas Campion (sometimes spelled Campian; 12 February 1567 – 1 March 1620) was an English composer, poet, and physician. He was born in London, educated at Cambridge, and studied law in Gray's Inn. He wrote over a hundred lute songs, masques for dancing, and an authoritative technical treatise on music. A famous poem by Campion is There Is a Garden in Her Face.

== Life ==
"I care not for these ladies"
Lute song by Campion

"Beauty, since you so much desire"
Sexually suggestive lute song by Campion

Campion was born in London, the son of John Campion, a clerk of the Court of Chancery, and Lucy (née Searle – daughter of Laurence Searle, one of the Queen's serjeants-at-arms). Upon the death of Campion's father in 1576, his mother married Augustine Steward, dying soon afterwards. His stepfather assumed charge of the boy and sent him, in 1581, to study at Peterhouse, Cambridge as a "gentleman pensioner"; he left the university after four years without taking a degree. He later entered Gray's Inn to study law in 1586. However, he left in 1595 without having been called to the bar.

On 10 February 1605, he received his medical degree from the University of Caen.

Campion is thought to have lived in London, practising as a physician, until his death in March 1620 – possibly of the plague. He was apparently unmarried and had no children. He was buried the same day at St Dunstan-in-the-West in Fleet Street.

He was implicated in the murder of Sir Thomas Overbury, but was eventually exonerated, as it was found that he had unwittingly delivered the bribe that had procured Overbury's death.

== Poetry and songs ==
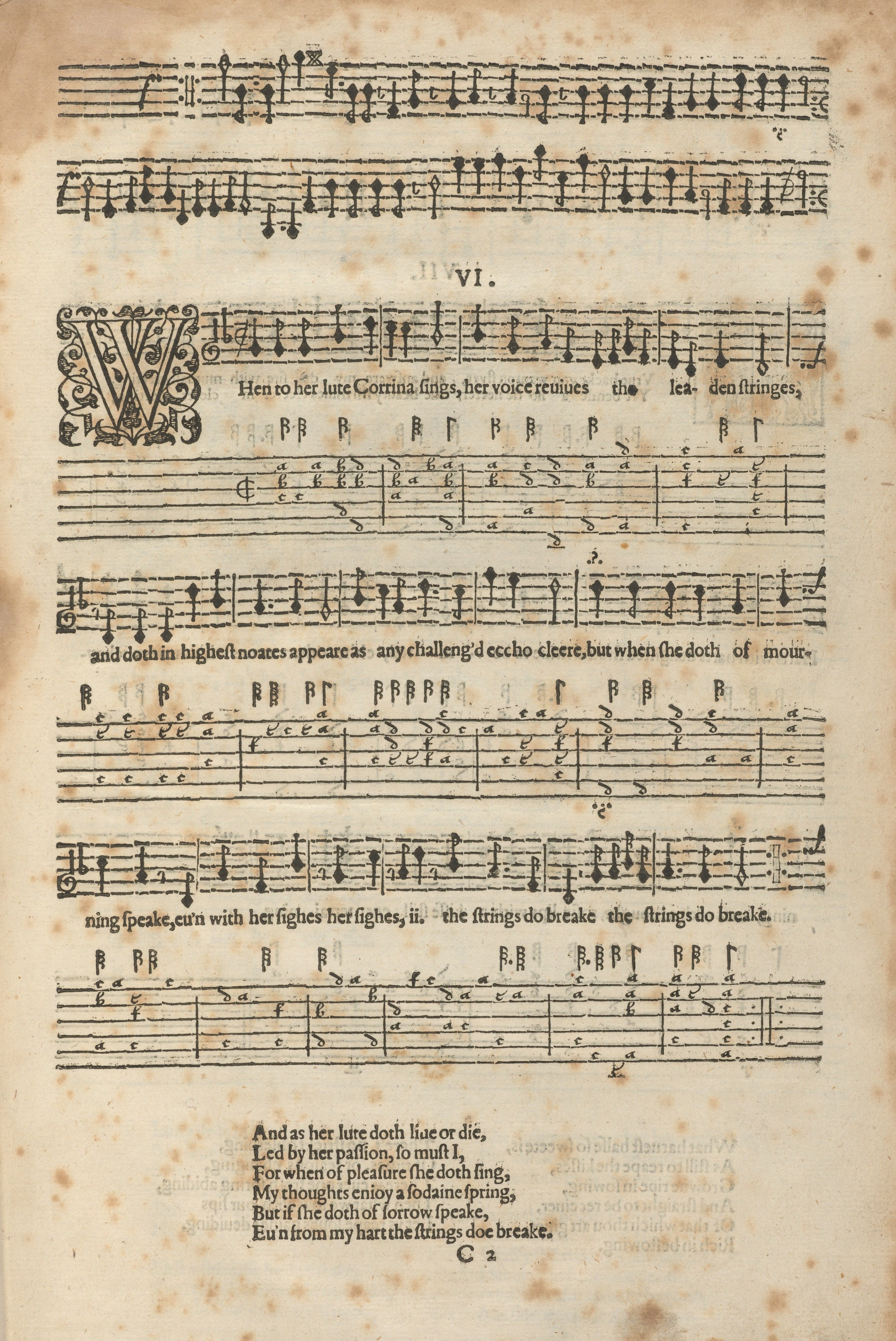
A Book of Ayres, 1601, with words by Campion and music by Philip Rosseter

The body of his works is considerable, the earliest known being a group of five anonymous poems included in the "Songs of Divers Noblemen and Gentlemen", appended to Newman's edition of Sir Philip Sidney's Astrophel and Stella, which appeared in 1591. In 1595, Poemata, a collection of Latin panegyrics, elegies and epigrams was published, winning him a considerable reputation. This was followed, in 1601, by a songbook, A Booke of Ayres, with words by himself and music composed by himself and Philip Rosseter. The following year he published his Observations in the Art of English Poesie, "against the vulgar and unartificial custom of riming," in favour of rhymeless verse on the model of classical quantitative verse. Campion's theories on poetry were criticised by Samuel Daniel in "Defence of Rhyme" (1603).

In 1607, he wrote and published a masque for the occasion of the marriage of Lord Hayes, and, in 1613, issued a volume of Songs of Mourning: Bewailing the Untimely Death of Prince Henry, set to music by John Coprario. The same year he wrote and arranged three masques: The Lords' Masque for the marriage of Princess Elizabeth; an entertainment for the amusement of Queen Anne at Caversham House; and a third masque for the marriage of the Earl of Somerset to the infamous Frances Howard, Countess of Essex. If, moreover, as appears quite likely, his Two Bookes of Ayres (both words and music written by himself) belongs also to this year, it was indeed his annus mirabilis.

In 1615, he published a book on counterpoint, A New Way of Making Fowre Parts in Counterpoint By a Most Familiar and Infallible Rule, a technical treatise which was for many years the standard textbook on the subject. It was included, with annotations by Christopher Sympson, in Playford's Brief Introduction to the Skill of Musick, and two editions appear to have been published by 1660.

Some time in or after 1617 appeared his Third and Fourth Booke of Ayres. In 1618 appeared the airs that were sung and played at Brougham Castle on the occasion of the King's entertainment there, the music by George Mason and John Earsden, while the words were almost certainly by Campion. In 1619, he published his Epigrammatum Libri II. Umbra Elegiarum liber unus, a reprint of his 1595 collection with considerable omissions, additions (in the form of another book of epigrams) and corrections.

== Legacy ==
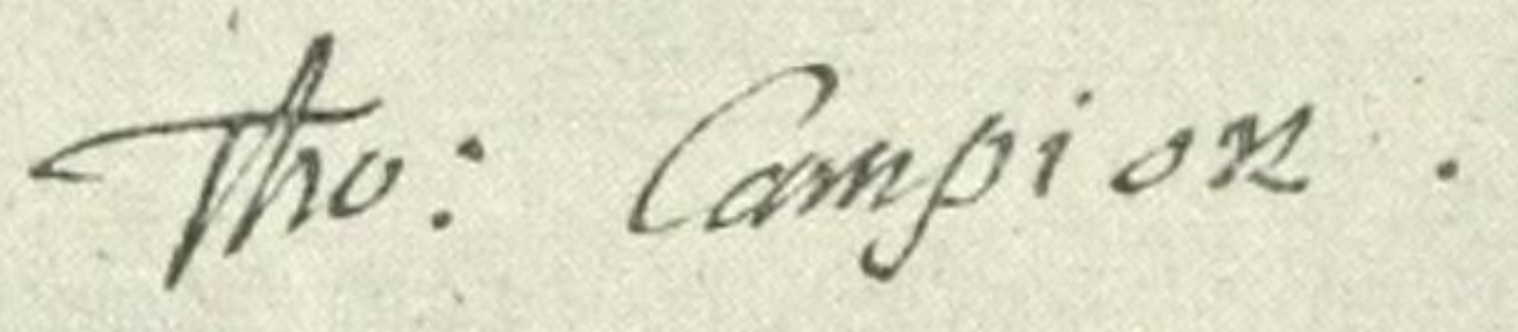
Minutes of the examination of Thomas Campion on 26 October 1615, prior to the arrest of Sir Thomas Monson for complicity in the Overbury murder

Campion made a nuncupative will on 1 March 1619/20 before "divers credible witnesses": a memorandum was made that he did "not longe before his death say that he did give all that he had unto Mr Phillip Rosseter, and wished that his estate had bin farre more", and Rosseter was sworn before Dr Edmund Pope to administer as principal legatee on 3 March 1619/20.

While Campion had attained a considerable reputation in his own day, in the years that followed his death his works sank into complete oblivion. No doubt this was due to the nature of the media in which he mainly worked, the masque and the song-book. The masque was an amusement at any time too costly to be popular, and during the Commonwealth period it was practically extinguished. The vogue of the song-books was even more ephemeral, and, as in the case of the masque, the Puritan ascendancy, with its distaste for all secular music, effectively put an end to the madrigal. Its loss involved that of many hundreds of dainty lyrics, including those of Campion, and it was due to the work of A. H. Bullen (see bibliography), who first published a collection of the poet's works in 1889, that his genius was recognised and his place among the foremost rank of Elizabethan lyric poets restored.

Early dictionary writers, such as Fétis, saw Campion as a theorist. It was much later on that people began to see him as a composer. He was the writer of a poem, "Cherry Ripe", which is not the later famous poem of that title but has several similarities.

=== In popular culture ===
Repeated reference was made to Campion (1567–1620) in an October 2010 episode of the BBC TV series James May's Man Lab (BBC2), where his works are used as the inspiration for a young man trying to serenade a female colleague. This segment was referenced in the second and third series of the programme as well.

Occasional mention is made of Campion ("Campian") in the comic strip 9 Chickweed Lane (e.g., 5 April 2004), referencing historical context for playing the lute.

== See also ==
- Canons of Elizabethan poetry

== Bibliography ==
=== In his lifetime ===
- A Booke of Ayres (1601)
- Observations in the Art of English Poesie (1602)
- A Discription of a Maske etc. to the Lord Hayes (1607)
- The Lords' Masque (1613)
- A New Way of Making Fowre Parts in Counterpoint (1613)
- The Art of Descant, 1671 edition.
- The Art of Descant, 1674 edition
- Two Bookes of Ayres (1613?)
- A Discription of a Maske on S. Stephen's night (1614)
- The Third and Fourth Booke of Ayres (1617)

=== Twentieth century editions of works and criticism ===
- Bullen, A H (ED.). Songs and masques, with Observations in the art of English poesy (London: A H Bullen, 1903).
- Campion, Thomas. A book of airs, as written to be sung to the lute and viol (Peter Pauper Press, 1944).
- "Campion, Thomas". Dictionary of National Biography. London: Smith, Elder & Co. 1885–1900.
- Davis, Walter R. Thomas Campion (Twayne Publishers, 1987).
- Davis, Walter R. and J. Mas Patrick, eds. The Works of Thomas Campion. W.W. Norton & Co., 1970. ISBN 978-0393004397
- Eldridge, Muriel T. Thomas Campion: his poetry and music (Vantage Press, 1971).
- Lindley, David .Thomas Campion (Leiden, 1986).
- Lowbury, Edward, et al. Thomas Campion: Poet, Composer, Physician. Chatto & Windus, 1970. ISBN 978-0701114770
- MacDonagh, Thomas. Thomas Campion and the art of English poetry (Dublin: Talbot Press, 1913).
- Vivian, Percival (Ed.). Campion's works (Oxford : Clarendon Press, 1909).
- Watson, George & Willison, Ian Roy. The new Cambridge bibliography of English literature, Volume 1 (Cambridge University Press, 1971) pp. 1905–6.
