= Robert Johnson (English composer) =

English composer and lutenist (1583–1633)

Robert Johnson (c. 1583 – 1633) was an English composer and lutenist of the late Tudor and early Jacobean eras. He is sometimes called "Robert Johnson II" to distinguish him from an earlier Scottish composer. He worked with William Shakespeare, providing music for some of his later plays.

== Early life ==
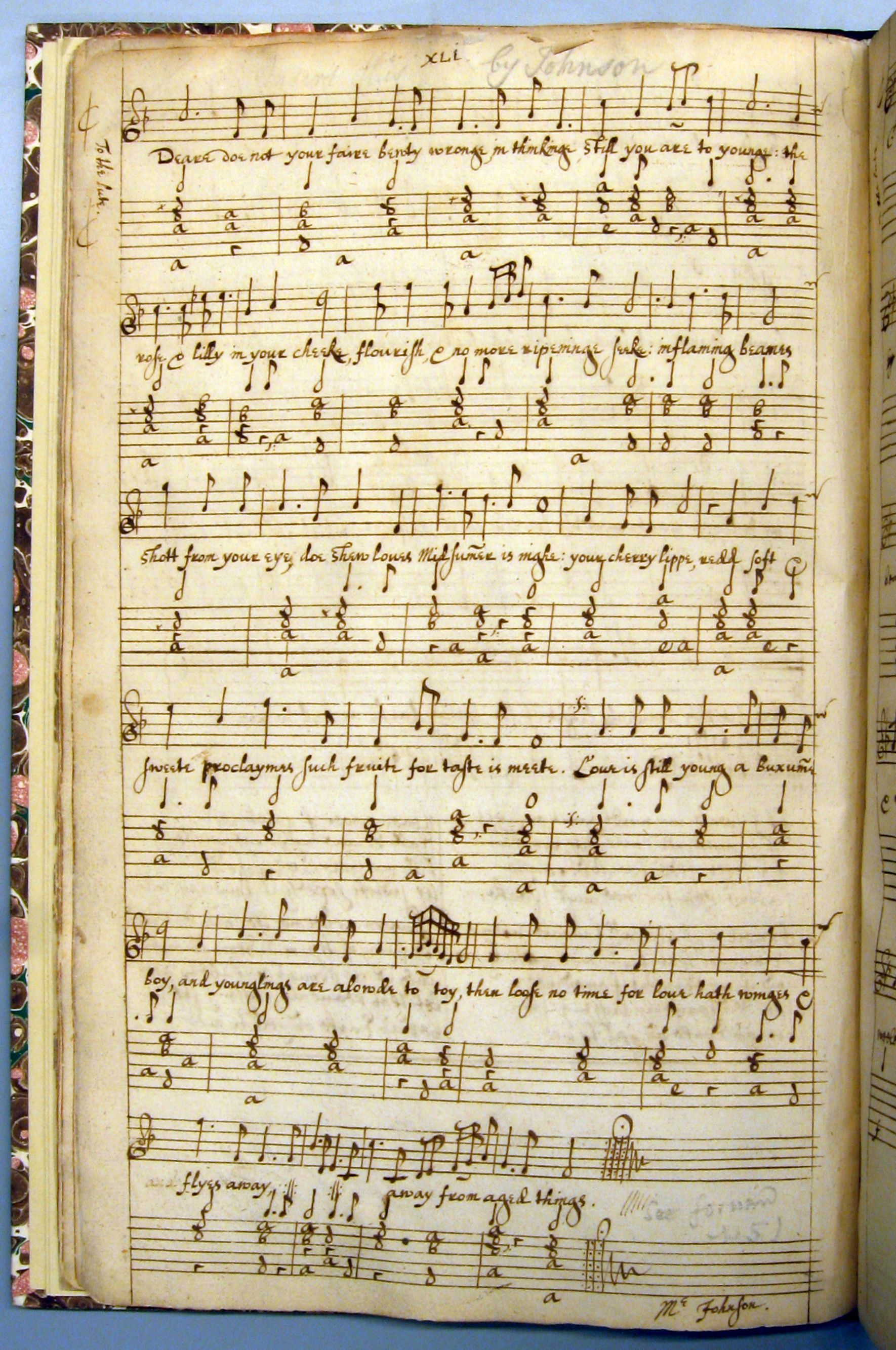
"Deare doe not your faire beuty wronge" by Johnson as it appears in the manuscript Drexel 4175—the only song in the collection with authorial attribution (at bottom right)

Robert Johnson was the son of John Johnson, who was a lutenist to Elizabeth I. In 1594, Robert's father died, and in 1596, he joined the household of George Carey, 2nd Baron Hunsdon as an apprentice. Robert is assumed to have been around 13 at the time, as this was a typical age to begin an apprenticeship, but his date of birth is unknown. Carey and his wife, Elizabeth Spencer, were patrons of the lutenist and composer John Dowland, who dedicated various compositions to them. The family had a London house (Hunsdon House, Blackfriars) and a country home (Hunsdon House, Hunsdon, Hertfordshire), which partially survives.

Johnson joined the Carey household at an interesting time in their patronage of the arts. In 1597, Dowland dedicated his First book of songs and ayres to George Carey. As well as supporting musicians, Carey was patron of a theatre company to which William Shakespeare belonged. In 1596/7, the company was briefly known as Baron Hunsdon's Men, but is better known as Lord Chamberlain's Men (the name they used after Carey became Lord Chamberlain in 1597), or their subsequent name, the King's Men. It is not known whether Johnson worked with this theatre company on any of their productions in the 1590s, such as The Merry Wives of Windsor. However, he certainly provided music for the King's Men in a later stage of his career.

== Employment at court ==
Johnson's patron George Carey died in 1603. The following year, Johnson found work at the court of James I, where a number of lutenists were employed. Lutes came in various sizes, and Johnson may have specialised in the bass lute when playing in consort music.

Johnson was lutenist to Prince Henry. He composed music for the masques and entertainments which were popular at court in the Jacobean era. For example, he wrote music for Oberon, the Faery Prince in which Prince Henry took the title role and, after the prince's death in 1612, The Memorable Masque of the Middle Temple and Lincoln's Inn. He also served at the court of Charles I, remaining on the royal payroll until 1633, the year of his death.

== Compositions for the King's Men ==
Johnson's surviving compositions for the King's Men theatrical company have been dated to 1610–1617. During these years, the King's Men were producing plays by Shakespeare and other playwrights, such as Ben Jonson, Francis Beaumont, and John Fletcher. Johnson's main claim to fame is that he composed the original settings for some of Shakespeare's lyrics, the best-known being probably those from The Tempest: "Where the Bee Sucks" and "Full Fathom Five". He is the only composer known to have composed the original settings of Shakespeare's lyrics. While other contemporary settings of Shakespeare's lyrics exist, for example, those by Thomas Morley, they have not been proved to be connected to a stage performance.

=== Johnson and the Blackfriars Theatre ===
From 1608, the King's Men company was using the Blackfriars Theatre as its winter base, and this may have influenced the songs and instrumental music required from Johnson. The Blackfriars Theatre, which had previously been used by a company of acting/singing children, offered increased scope for incidental music compared to the Globe Theatre. One difference between the theatres was that Blackfriars was an indoors venue, lit by candles which needed to be replaced between acts. It featured music between acts, a practice which the induction to Marston's The Malcontent (published 1604) indicates was not common in the public theatres at that time. Shakespeare's The Tempest (c. 1610), in which the stage directions call for music and sound effects, is an example of a play which may have been written for performance at Blackfriars. However, the company continued to perform at the Globe, and other venues such as the court, where Johnson's theatre music would presumably also have been heard.

== Works/discography ==
There is a partial discography on the HOASM website. Notable versions of the songs from The Tempest are included in Alfred Deller's album Shakespeare Songs (1967). Other recordings include a recital of Robert's lute music by Nigel North on Naxos and a lute recital by Lynda Sayce of music by Robert and his father on Dervorguilla Records.

=== Music connected with Ben Jonson's plays ===
- "Have you seen the bright lily grow?" from Ben Jonson's comedy The Devil Is an Ass, 1616.

The best-selling recording is that of Sting on the 2006 album Songs from the Labyrinth.

- Oberon, the Faery Prince, masque written by Ben Jonson (performed in 1611). Robert Johnson collaborated on the music with another composer, Alfonso Ferrabosco the younger. Recorded by Musicians of the Globe.

=== Music connected with Shakespeare's plays ===
The following list mainly follows the order of "Shakespeare's lutenist" (a recording of the singers Emma Kirkby and David Thomas with the lutenist Anthony Rooley):

- Where the bee sucks (The Tempest)
- Hark, hark! the lark (Cymbeline)
- Come hither, you that love
- As I walked forth
- Woods, rocks, and mountains (supposedly from the lost Shakespearean play Cardenio)
- 'Tis late and cold
- O let us howl
- Arm, arm!
- Come away, Hecate
- Fantasia (lute)
- Pavan I in C minor
- Pavan II in F minor
- Pavan III in C minor
- Galliard (lute)
- Charon, oh Charon
- Away delights
- Come, heavy sleep
- Care-charming sleep
- Alman I (lute)
- Alman II (lute)
- Alman III (lute)
- Alman IV
- Corant (lute)
- Full fathom five (The Tempest)
- Adieu, fond love
- Come away, thou lady gay
- Tell me, dearest

== See also ==
- Drexel 4175
