= Norman Ault =

Thomas Norman Ault (17 December 1880 – 6 February 1950) was a book illustrator and writer, now best known as a compiler of anthologies.

He wrote children's literature with his wife (He)Lena, who died in 1904. He later was noted as a scholar of English poetry of the seventeenth century, and Alexander Pope.

== Works ==
- The Rhyme Book (1906) with Lena Ault
- The Podgy Book of Tales with Lena Ault
- Dreamland Shores (1920)
- Life In Ancient Britain 1920
- The Poet's Life Of Christ (1923) editor
- Elizabethan Lyrics: From The Original Texts (1925) anthology
- Seventeenth Century Lyrics: From The Original Texts (1928) anthology
- Pope's Own Miscellany (Nonesuch Press, 1935)
- The Prose Works of Alexander Pope: The Earlier Works, 1711-1720 (1936)
- A Treasury of Unfamiliar Lyrics (1938) anthology
- A New Light on Pope (1949)
- Alexander Pope Minor Poems (1954) editor, completed by John Butt

== Bibliography ==
- The Imaginative Book Illustration Society at has a bibliography by Robin Greer in Studies in Illustration no.2 1996
