= The Memorable Masque of the Middle Temple and Lincoln's Inn =

Play written by George Chapman

The Memorable Masque of the Middle Temple and Lincoln's Inn was a Jacobean era masque, written by George Chapman, and with costumes, sets, and stage effects designed by Inigo Jones. It was performed in the Great Hall of Whitehall Palace on 15 February 1613, as one item in the elaborate festivities surrounding the marriage of Princess Elizabeth, daughter of King James I, to Frederick V, Elector Palatine in the Rhineland.

== Exoticism ==
The masque had a Virginia theme; Chapman had been a follower of the Prince of Wales, Prince Henry, before Henry's death in November 1612, and Henry had been a strong backer of the movement to colonize the New World. The principal masquers were stylized as Native Americans, "Princes of Virginia" and "sun priests"," though without much representative accuracy: they were dressed in "cloth of silver embroidered with gold," with olive-colored masks or "vizerds", though they were also lavishly feathered and equipped with ornaments "imitating Indian work" — an attempt at an effect "altogether estrangeful and Indian-like." The conceit was that these sun-worshippers had come to honor the wedding couple and to accept Christianity. The princes' costumes of "cloth of silver with a trail of gold" can be seen as a textile allegory of Britain's economic ventures in the New World that eventually led to transatlantic slavery. One performer, a Mr Peters, refused to return his costume.

The masquers were said to come from Virginia, but the text and scenery also alluded to sun-worship and gold mining which had more to do with ventures in South America. The imagery was based on Walter Ralegh's The Discovery of Guiana, the account of his 1595 El Dorado expedition, and the idea of the mother of gold. Chapman had written on Guiana in a poem De Guiana in 1596, and transferred the imagery to Virginia. In the poem Chapman outlined a female and Elizabethan England that would be a sibling and a mother to Guiana in "a golden world".

== The show ==
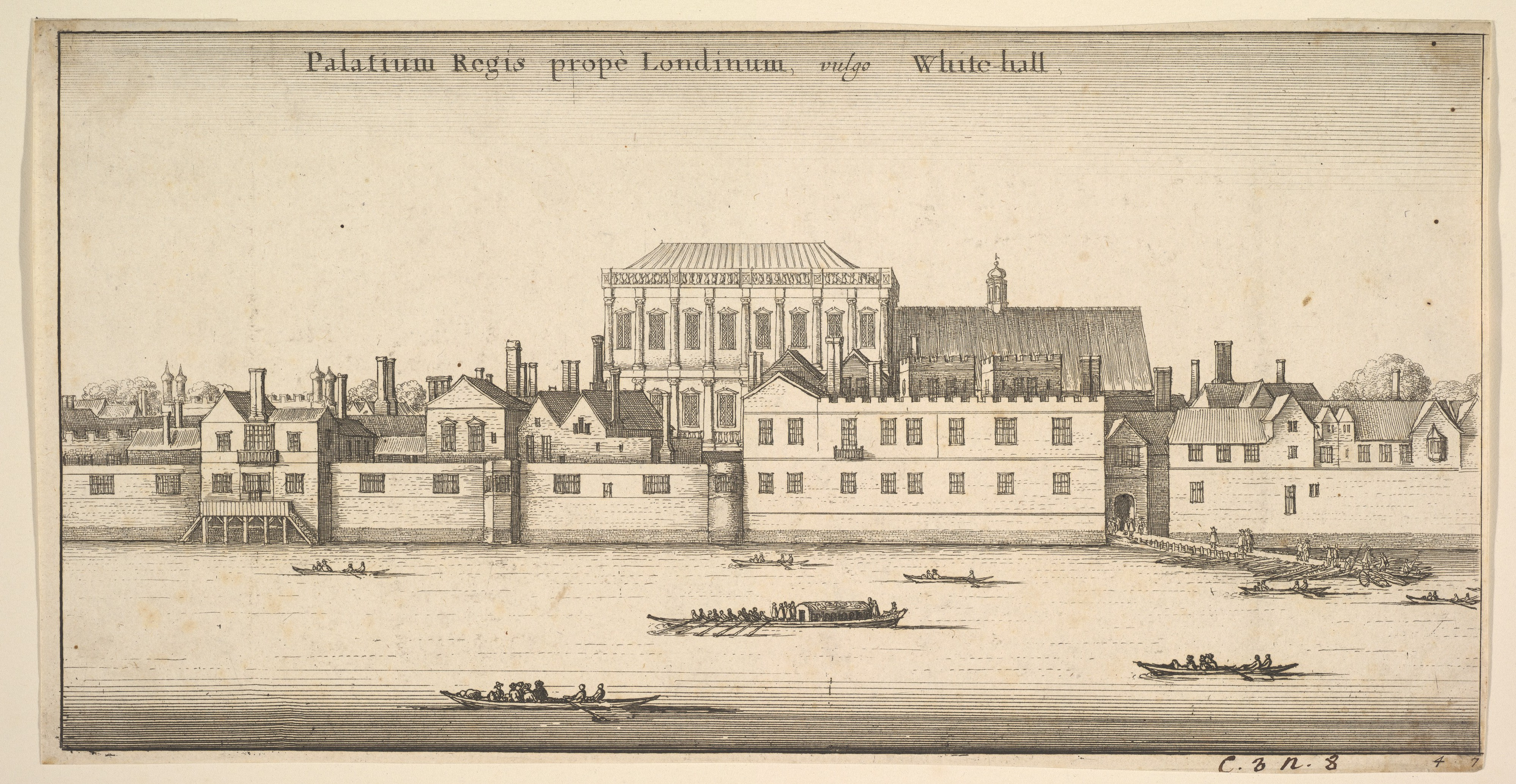
Whitehall Palace and the Thames, with the Great Hall roof seen next to the 1619 Banqueting House, Wenceslaus Hollar

The celebration began with a torchlit parade down Chancery Lane, headed by fifty gentlemen on horseback, followed by the figures of the anti-masque, boys dressed as baboons in "Neapolitan suits and great ruffs," and the musicians and masquers in chariots. King James ordered the procession to go around the tilt yard at Whitehall, while the royal party observed from a gallery.

Each horse in the procession was attended by two "Moores", African servants, who were dressed as Indian slaves. The Venetian ambassador Antonio Foscarini wrote that there were 100 Africans, dressed in the blue and gold costume of Indian slaves.

At Whitehall, Jones's stage set was a golden mountain. Next to it on either side were a silver temple, octagonal and domed, and a hollow tree — representing the poles of experience of masque and anti-masque: temple for the masquers, tree for the "baboons." The presenters were figures of classical mythology and personifications typical of the masque form: Plutus; a personified Honor, with Eunomia, one of the three Hours, as her priestess; and Capriccio, a Commedia dell'arte-style figure. Capriccio reveals his plan to gain the wealth of the gold mines of Plutus. Plutus sends Capriccio away, and Honor enters. The "Virginians" perform a rite to the sun.

The golden rock moved forward toward the viewers, then split open to release the anti-masquers. Later the top of the mountain opened to reveal the principal masquers and a crew of torchbearers. The torchbearers danced with torches lit at both ends; then the masquers danced their dances, finally joined by the audience. The general reaction was highly positive, giving the masque a reputation as one of the best-received works of its type in the Stuart era.

== Sponsorship ==
The masque was sponsored by two of the four Inns of Court, those mentioned in the title. The other two Inns of Court sponsored their own wedding tribute, The Masque of the Inner Temple and Gray's Inn, by Francis Beaumont. The records of Lincoln's Inn show that the Inn spent just over £1086 on the masque, charging its members fees ranging from £1 10 shillings to £4 to pay the bill. The records of the Middle Temple are not as complete in their details, though its share of the total bill was likely equal, and its charges were probably very similar. Chapman was paid £100 for his masque, while Robert Johnson earned £45 for his music.

John Chamberlain wrote that Sir Edward Phelips, the Master of the Rolls, and Dick Martin, a supporter of the Virginia Company, were the "chief doers and undertakers". Phelips paid Inigo Jones £110 for the scenery and stage-works on behalf of the Middle Temple and Lincoln's Inn.

== Publication ==
The masque was entered into the Stationers' Register on 27 February 1613; the quarto edition that followed, printed by George Eld for the bookseller George Norton, is undated, but probably was issued as promptly as possible after the masque's performance, to capitalize on public interest. A second edition, also undated, was later issued by Norton. Chapman dedicated the work to Sir Edward Phelips, who along with Henry Hobart the Attorney General had been responsible for selecting Chapman as the author and for driving the whole project to a successful completion.

== Credits ==
Unlike Ben Jonson, Inigo Jones's most common literary partner in masquing, Chapman was a close friend of Jones, and did not engage in the kind of ego competition that Jonson maintained with Jones for some two decades. The masque's printed text shows that Chapman let Jones — a man of no small ego himself — take the lead in grabbing credit; the title page states that the work was "Invented and fashioned, with the ground and special structure of the whole work, by our kingdom's most artful and ingenious architect Inigo Jones. Supplied, applied, digested and written by George Chapman."

Robert Johnson was paid £45 for writing music for the songs. The lutenists included Thomas Cutting, Thomas Davies, John Dowland, Robert Dowland, Thomas Ford, Philip Rosseter, John Sturte, and Robert Taylor.

== Sources ==
- Chambers, E. K. The Elizabethan Stage. 4 Volumes, Oxford, Clarendon Press, 1923.
- Leapman, Michael. Inigo: The Troubled Life of Inigo Jones, Architect of the English Renaissance. London, Headline Book Publishing, 2003.
