= Samuel Brooke =

English playwright (c.1575–1631)

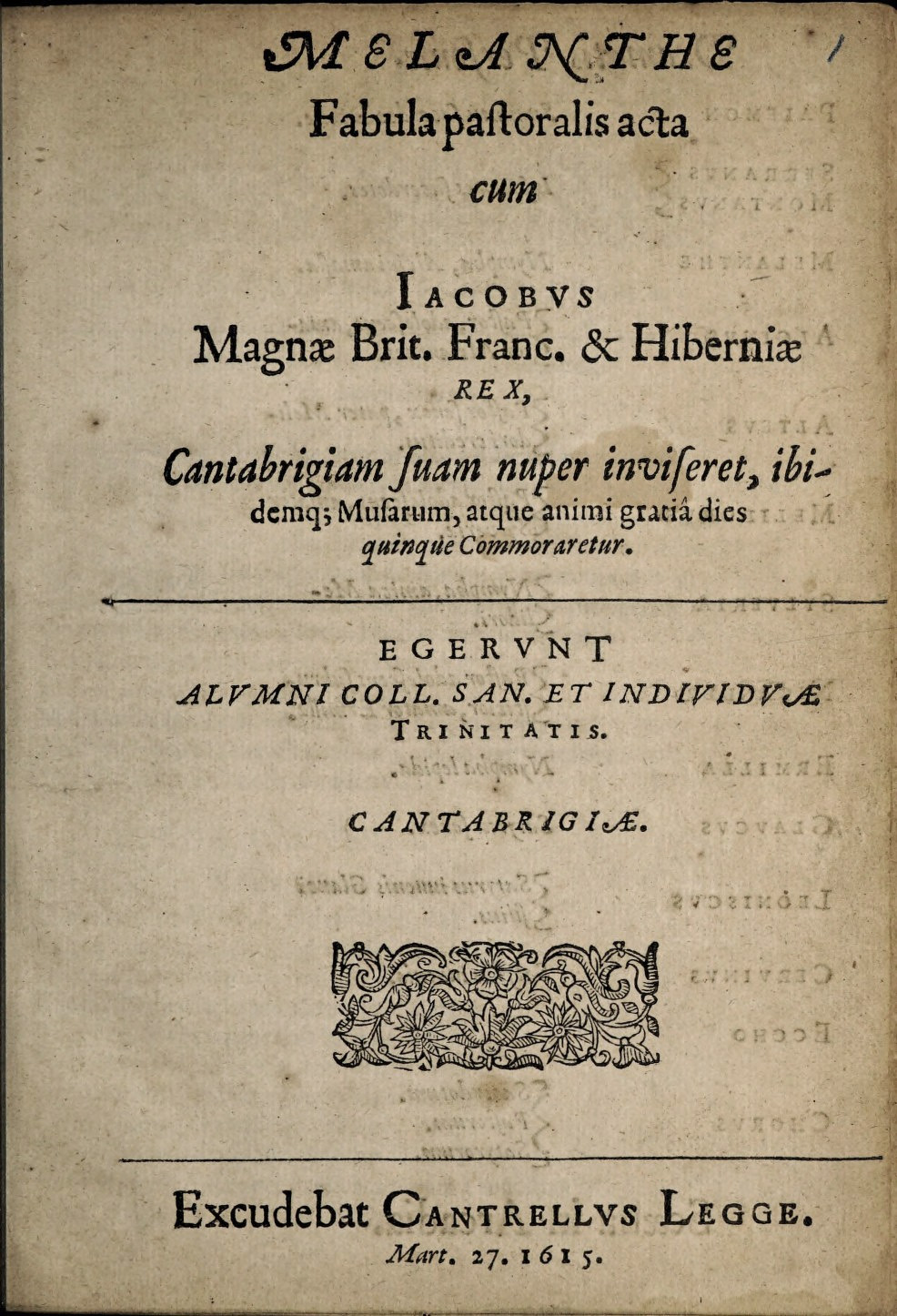
Title page of Melanthe, a pastoral Latin comedy by Brooke, performed before James I by the students of Trinity College in 1615

Dr Samuel Brooke (c. 1575–1631) was a Gresham Professor of Divinity (appointed 1612), a playwright, the chaplain of Trinity College, Cambridge and subsequently the Master of Trinity (1629–1631). He was known to be an Arminian and anti-Calvinist. In 1631 he was appointed archdeacon of Coventry.

== Life ==
He was the son of Robert Brooke of York, the brother of Christopher Brooke who appears in George Wither's eclogues under the pastoral name of Cuddie. Samuel Brooke was educated at Westminster School and Trinity College, Cambridge, where he was admitted in 1596; he proceeded M.A. 1604, B.D. 1607, and D.D. 1615.

He was imprisoned for a short period, by the action of Sir George More, for secretly celebrating the marriage of John Donne with More's daughter. He was promoted to the office of chaplain to Henry Frederick, Prince of Wales, who recommended him (26 September 1612) as Gresham Professor of Divinity; he was later chaplain to both James I and Charles I.

On 13 June 1618 he became rector of St Margaret, Lothbury, London, and 10 July 1621 was incorporated D.D. at Oxford. He was elected master of Trinity College, Cambridge, 5 September 1629, and on 17 November resigned his Gresham professorship. On 13 May 1631 Brooke was admitted archdeacon of Coventry, and he died 16 September 1632. He was buried without monument or epitaph in Trinity College Chapel.

== Works ==
Between 1611 and 1615 he wrote three Latin plays, which were performed by the undergraduates of Trinity College: Adelphe, an adaptation of La Sorella by Giambattista della Porta; Scyros, an adaptation of Filli di Sciro by Guidubaldo Bonarelli; and Melanthe, a pastoral comedy performed before James I during his visit to Cambridge in March 1615. A central character in Melanthe is Nicander, the loutish heir of a rich father, who is mocked and teased by the shepherdess Ermilla, before she finally decides to accept him as her husband; the play also features a number of satyrs, who occasionally sing and dance.

William Prynne in his Canterburie's Doome attacked Brooke as a disciple of William Laud, and stated that in 1630 Brooke was engaged on Arminian treatise on predestination. Laud encouraged him to complete this book, but afterwards declined to sanction its publication on account of a general prohibition on debating the subject. None of Brooke's works were printed. Beside the treatise already mentioned (a manuscript of the first three books of which is in the Library of Trinity College, Cambridge), he wrote a tract on the Thirty-nine Articles, and a discourse, dedicated to the Earl of Pembroke, entitled De Auxilio Divinæ Gratiæ Exercitatio theologica, nimirum: An possibile sit duos eandem habere Gratiæ Mensuram, et tamen unus convertatur et credat; alter non: e Johan. xi. 45, 46. ("A Theological Essay on the Assistance of Divine Grace, namely: Whether it be possible for two people to have the same Measure of Grace, but that one should be converted and believe, and the other not." - from John Ch. XI, vs. 45-46.) The manuscript of this is in the Cambridge University Library.

== Manuscripts ==
- Trinity College, Cambridge, MS B. 15. 13. 'De Natura & Ordine divinæ Prædestinationis in Ecclesiâ, vel intra Ecclesiam Dei.'
- Cambridge University Library, MS Additional 44, item 16. 'De Auxilio Divinæ Gratiæ Exercitatio theologica.'

Academic offices
Preceded by William Osbaldeston	Gresham Professor of Divinity; 1612–1629	Succeeded by Richard Holdsworth
Preceded by Leonard Mawe	Master of Trinity College, Cambridge; 1629–1631	Succeeded by Thomas Comber
