= John Coprario =

English composer and viol player (c. 1570–80 – 1626)

Fantasia à2, VdGS No.1, Cambridge. King's College, Rowe Mss.112-13 (ca.1620)
Performed by Phillip W. Serna, Treble & Tenor Viols

John Coprario (c. 1570–80 – c. June 1626), also known as Giovanni Coprario or Coperario, was an English composer, viol player and teacher.

== Life and career ==
According to later commentators, such as John Playford and Roger North, he changed his name from either Cowper or Cooper to Coperario in the early 17th century (at least as early as February 1601), although he himself spelled his name "John Coprario". Anthony Wood said he changed his name after an extended visit to Italy, and though he is documented as having visited the Low Countries in 1603, evidence confirming his presence in Italy has not been found. From 1622 he served and may have taught the Prince of Wales, for whom he continued to work upon his accession as Charles I. His longtime patron was Edward Seymour, Earl of Hertford, for whom, according to Thomas Fuller's The History of the Worthies of England (1662), he taught William Lawes.

Among Coprario's works are fantasias, suites, and other works for viols and violins, and two collections of songs, Funeral Teares (1606) and Songs of Mourning: Bewailing the Untimely Death of Prince Henry (1613). Coprario wrote songs for The Somerset Masque performed on 26 December 1613. He also penned a treatise on composition, Rules how to Compose (c. 1610–1616).

According to Ernst Meyer, Coprario was a Londoner who Italianized his name as Italian music and musicians became more fashionable, and spent much of his life as a musician in the royal court.

Ninety-six fantasias for three up to six voices, most of them in two Oxford and Royal College of Music collections, were known to exist by Coprario (as of 1946). Meyer also notes that most of Coprario's five- and six-part fantasias are mainly transcriptions, or imitations, of his madrigals, but that his fantasias for three or four instrumental parts are, formally especially, independently interesting.
