= The Grange, Cawood =

Historic building in Cawood, England

Coordinates: 53°49′50″N 1°07′33″W

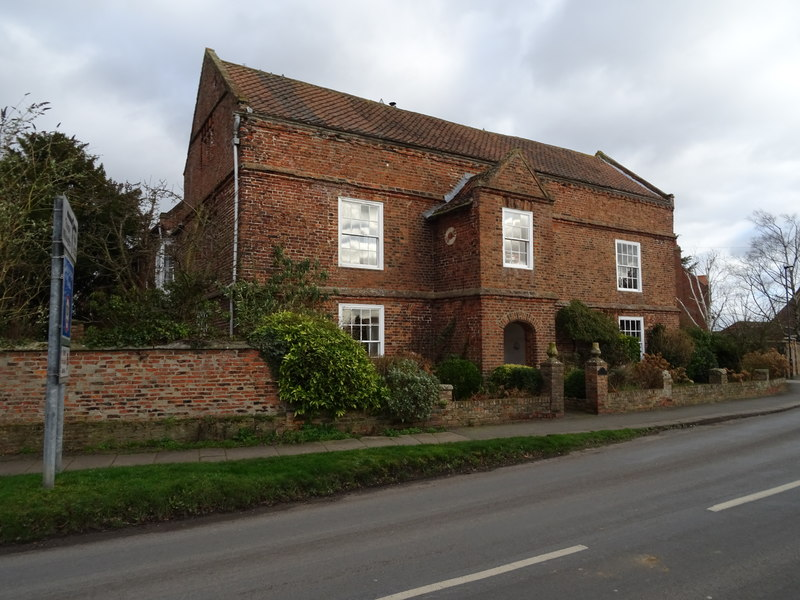
The building, in 2020

The Grange is a historic building in Cawood, a village in North Yorkshire, in England.

The building was constructed in the 16th century, for the Nicholson family, who held offices under the Archbishop of York. It was rebuilt in the mid-17th century, and was altered in the 18th century, and again around 1900. As part of these last changes, the original roof was replaced. Around this time, four life-sized Mediaeval sculptures believed to represent the Four Evangelists were found buried at All Saints' Church, Cawood, and were put on display outside the house. They were later passed to the owner of Cawood Castle, and two are now in the Yorkshire Museum. The house was Grade II* listed in 1966.

The house is partly timber framed, with the rest in orange-red brick, with floor bands, a dentilled moulded cornice, a pantile roof with brick-capped kneelers and gable ends, and a curvilinear gable on the rear wing. It has two storeys and an L-shaped plan, with a front range of three bays, a rear wing, and two outshuts. On the front is a two-storey pedimented porch with an elliptical entrance, side seats inside, and an internal doorway. The windows on the front are sashes with alternate proud and flush voussoirs, and elsewhere there are mullioned windows. Inside, there is 17th-century panelling in the hall, with a 20th-century frieze, and original 17th-century panelling in a room to its right. There are also some early panelled doors.

== See also ==
- Grade II* listed buildings in North Yorkshire (district)
- Listed buildings in Cawood
