= John Everard (preacher) =

English preacher and philosopher

John Everard (1584?–1641) was an English preacher and author. He was also a Familist, hermetic thinker, Neoplatonist, and alchemist. He is known for his translations of mystical and hermetic literature.

== Life ==
He graduated B.A, at Clare College, Cambridge in 1600, M.A. in 1607, and D.D in 1619. He was lecturer at St Martin in the Fields from 1618. He was imprisoned, twice in a short space of time, for preaching about Spanish cruelties, as a way of commenting against the Spanish Match.

He was later chaplain to Henry Rich, 1st Earl of Holland, and a religious radical pursuing his own beliefs. He lived for some years with the furnace-maker William White, and during the 1620s was in touch with Robert Fludd; he possessed copied manuscripts of Nicholas Hill. He was a friend of Roger Brereley the Grindletonian, and was praised by John Webster. He was brought before the Court of High Commission in 1636, when he was vicar of Fairstead, Essex, and charged with various heresies: Familism, Antinomianism, Anabaptism. He was fined heavily. On a second occasion, in 1640, he recanted his spiritualist beliefs.

His sermons, published posthumously, are between Martin Marprelate and Richard Overton in style. In the preface by Rapha Harford to Some Gospel-treasures Opened, the publisher places Evarard centrally on two axes, rationalist-formalist and Familist-Ranter.

== Translations ==
- Theologia Germanica - it is now disputed that Everard was responsible for the English translation.
- Of the Tree of Knowledge of Good and Evil by Sebastian Franck
- De Docta Ignorantia by Nicholas of Cusa, made in the 1620s, published 1650
- Johann Tauler
- Corpus Hermeticum, published 1650; he provided commentary, left in manuscript. The first edition covered the Pimander; the second in 1657 added the Asclepius.
