= John Webster (minister) =

English cleric, physician and chemist (1610-1682)

John Webster (1610–1682), also known as Johannes Hyphastes, was an English cleric, physician and chemist with occult interests, a proponent of astrology and a sceptic about witchcraft. He is known for controversial works.

== Life ==
Webster was born at Thornton in Craven in Yorkshire. He claimed education at the University of Cambridge. Although there is no evidence for this, his writing displays a learned style.

Webster studied under the Hungarian alchemist Johannes Huniades (János Bánfi-Hunyadi), who is known to have lectured at Gresham College.

Webster became a curate in Kildwick in 1634. He has been linked to Roger Brearley, the Grindletonian leader active at this period in Kildwick (three years earlier); and classified as an Antinomian. During the First English Civil War, Webster left his position as a teacher in Clitheroe and became a surgeon and army chaplain in the Parliamentarian forces. At a later point he was with the forces of Colonel Richard Shuttleworth. In 1648 he became vicar at Mitton. From a Grindeltonian convert, he moved closer to Quaker views. He has been called a Seeker.

Webster preached with William Erbery on 12 October 1653 in a dispute with two London ministers at All Hallows, Lombard Street. Disorder resulted after Erbery took a particularly aggressive line against the established clergy. Webster had preached at All Hallows in 1652.

In the late 1650s Webster was again in Clitheroe. In 1658 he was arrested and had papers seized. He gave up the ministry, and practiced as a physician. He died at Clitheroe.

== Works on education ==
In The Saints Guide (1653) he rejected the worldly wisdom taught in schools as of no spiritual value. He made the case against any kind of university-educated clergy. Austin Woolrych considers this pamphlet, dated April 1653, was probably a response to the dissolution of the Rump Parliament.

The Academiarum Examen of 1654 made detailed proposals for the reform of the university curriculum; it was dedicated to General John Lambert, a highly placed officer of the New Model Army. While arguing as a Baconian, Webster wanted to combine ideas from the experimental philosophy of the time with those of astrology and alchemy.

Webster was interested in some of the ideas of Comenius, for example the idea of a "real character"; he connected this with Egyptian hieroglyphs. Behind this is the conception of an Adamic language, and the recovery of Adam's knowledge from before the fall. He also advocated for the teaching of the works of Robert Fludd, and others such as Paracelsus. He was satisfied with neither the theological nor the medical training on offer.

When the Royal Society was set up, after the Restoration, Webster welcomed it.

== Authors mentioned in the Academiarum Examen ==
The Examen has 11 chapters, and builds up to the discussion in Chapter X of what in Aristotle’s teaching should be retained, and how amended. On the way, Webster introduces and marshals many modern authors, and a few scholastic and other medieval names, to illustrate his version of a new curriculum. Excluding classical authors and Church Fathers, at first appearance they comprise the following:

- Chapter I: Hugh of St Victor
- Chapter II: Descartes, Nicholas of Cusa, Francis Bacon
- Chapter III: John Dee, Comenius, Joseph Webbe, John Brinsley, William Oughtred, Harrigon, Trithemius, Giambattista Porta, Cornelius Agrippa, Claramuel, Gustavus Silenus, Roger Bacon, Kenelm Digby, Jakob Böhme
- Chapter IV: Pierre Gassendi, Justus Lipsius, Johann Baptist van Helmont, Nicholas Hill, Ramon Llull, Paulus Schalichius, Ficino
- Chapter V: John Napier, Henry Briggs, Galileo, Christoph Scheiner, Aguillonius, Hevelius, Thomas White, Tycho Brahe, Copernicus, Kepler, Nathanael Carpenter, Pico della Mirandola, Elias Ashmole, William Lilly, John Booker, Sanders, Nicholas Culpepper, Ubaldus, Marcus Marci, Baptista Benedictus
- Chapter VI: Abenrois, Thomas Aquinas, Duns Scotus, Albertus Magnus, Gregorius, Durandus, Harvaeus, Maronaeus, Alliacensis, Trismegistus, Geber, Arnoldus de Villa Nova, Basilius Valentinus, Johann Isaac Hollandus, Paracelsus, William Harvey, Robert Fludd, Crollius, Quercetan (Joseph Duchesne), William Gilbert, Mark Ridley, William Barlow, Cabaeus, Athanasius Kircher, Magnenus Regius (Johann Chrysostom Magnenus), Phocyllides Holwarda
- Chapter VII: Thomas Campanella, Lambertus Danaeus (Lambert Daneau), Jean Bodin, Machiavelli, Thomas Hobbes
- Chapter VIII: Erasmus, Luther, Ramus
- Chapter IX: Bullialdus
- Chapter X: Franciscus Patritius, Telesius, Melanchthon

According to Frances Yates:

In the heart of Puritan England, this Parliamentarian chaplain produces a work that is right in the Renaissance magico-scientific tradition, culminating in Dee and Fludd, and he thinks that this is what should be taught in the universities, together with Baconianism, which he sees as incomplete without such authors. Webster ignores the fact that Bacon expressly states that he is against the macro-microcosmic philosophy of the Paracelsians, and is under the impression that Bacon can be reconciled with it. And he seems to underline Bacon's omission of the Dee mathematics.

== Controversy over the Academiarum Examen ==
A reply from the Oxford academics Seth Ward and John Wilkins, in Vindiciae Academiarum (1654) was used by them as an opportunity to defend a more moderate programme of updating, partly put in place already. Ward and Wilkins put the case that Webster was ignorant of recent changes, and inconsistent in championing both Bacon and Fludd, whose methods were incompatible. Wilkins suggested Webster might be well matched with Alexander Ross: Ross was a most conservative supporter of Aristotle, who with Galen was Webster's main target in the classical authorities, and Wilkins had defended the Copernican system against Ross in a long controversy running from the late 1630s to the mid-1640s.

Ward and Wilkins used the same publication to argue against others (William Dell and Thomas Hobbes) who had been attacking the old universities of Cambridge and Oxford. Other opponents of the Examen were Thomas Hall and George Wither.

The long-running Hobbes-Wallis controversy was a by-product of this debate. It has also been taken as symptomatic of a developing split separating on academic issues the circle of Samuel Hartlib, close in views and sympathies to Webster, from those in the universities who in religious terms would be allies, on the issues of practical applications, and also the status of astrology, chemistry after Paracelsus and van Helmont, and pansophism.

== Other works ==
He edited William Erbery's works and wrote his biography in 1658, as The Testimony of William Erbery.

Metallographia (1671) was a chemical work. It attributed to minerals the property of growth. He had a corpuscle theory of matter, described as intermediate between those of Kenelm Digby and Herman Boerhaave. It also drew on the work of Robert Boyle; but the strong influence was that of Jan Baptist van Helmont; this book was one that Isaac Newton used in his own alchemical work. Daniel Georg Morhof criticised it as largely a compilation from German authors (Boyle was not mentioned); the views of Johann Pharamund Rhumelius were given at length.

His The Displaying of Supposed Witchcraft (1677) was a critical and sceptical review of evidence for witchcraft. According to Hugh Trevor-Roper, this is not an innovative work, but at the level of that of Johann Weyer. He opposed Henry More and Joseph Glanvill, who were arguing for the reality of witches. Webster went as far as suggesting that the Bible had been mistranslated to support that belief. It was translated into German, being published in 1719 at Halle where Christian Thomasius had made his scepticism an academic point of view. In the same year he defended the reputation of John Dee against Meric Casaubon. He had recommended Dee in the Examen, and was a proponent of natural magic. More edited Glanvill's earlier works on witchcraft, attacked by Webster, together with material of his own, as a reply, which appeared under Glanvill's name but after his death as the influential Saducismus Triumphatus.
