= Phineas Hodson =

English clergy

Phineas Hodson (died before 28 November 1646) was Chancellor of York Minister from 1611 to 1646. Hodson lived during a period of religious factionalism in Britain; as a prebendary in the Church of England he confronted the proliferation of dissenting sects, the agitations of England's Catholics, and — with the rise of Parliament after the death of James I — political attacks on the power of the bishopric. Hodson fell foul of post-Jacobean Parliamentary hostility to the established church and was impeached, but remained chancellor of York until his death.

== Nonconformists and Catholics ==
Hodson was a doctor of divinity. From 1579 to 1615 he held the advowson — the right to present a benefice — of Normanby parish in north Yorkshire. He was a trusted lieutenant of Tobias Matthew, Archbishop of York; in 1617 Matthew delegated Hodson to advise Roger Brearley, who had founded the Grindletonian nonconformist sect and been accused of heresy as a result, on how he might reconcile with the Church of England. At a time when the imprisonment of many Catholics had raised fears that England's prisons might become a hotbed of anti-establishment activity, Hodson contributed £25 a year for the provision of Protestant worship in York Castle.

== James I ==
Hodson was close to King James VI of Scotland (James I of England), and was one of three English divines to preach at an assembly James held at Glasgow in 1610. After James's death he preached the last sermon over the king's body, during its lying in state at Denmark House, before James's funeral in May 1625.

== Impeachment ==
Hodson's association with the Stuart monarchy made his position difficult when the Long Parliament was called. On 16 March 1641 Hodson and two other English clerics were impeached in the case of one James Smart, a nonconformist minister, whom the three were judged to have unjustly fined for seditious activities. Hodson was bailed in the case on 20 March 1641.

== Personal life ==
Hodson was a friend of the popular writer John Taylor.

Hodson's wife Jane, according to her epitaph in York Minster, died on 2 September 1636, aged 38, during the birth of her 24th child.
