= Tobias Matthew =

Archbishop of York from 1606 to 1628

The Most Reverend Tobias Matthew
- Archbishop of York
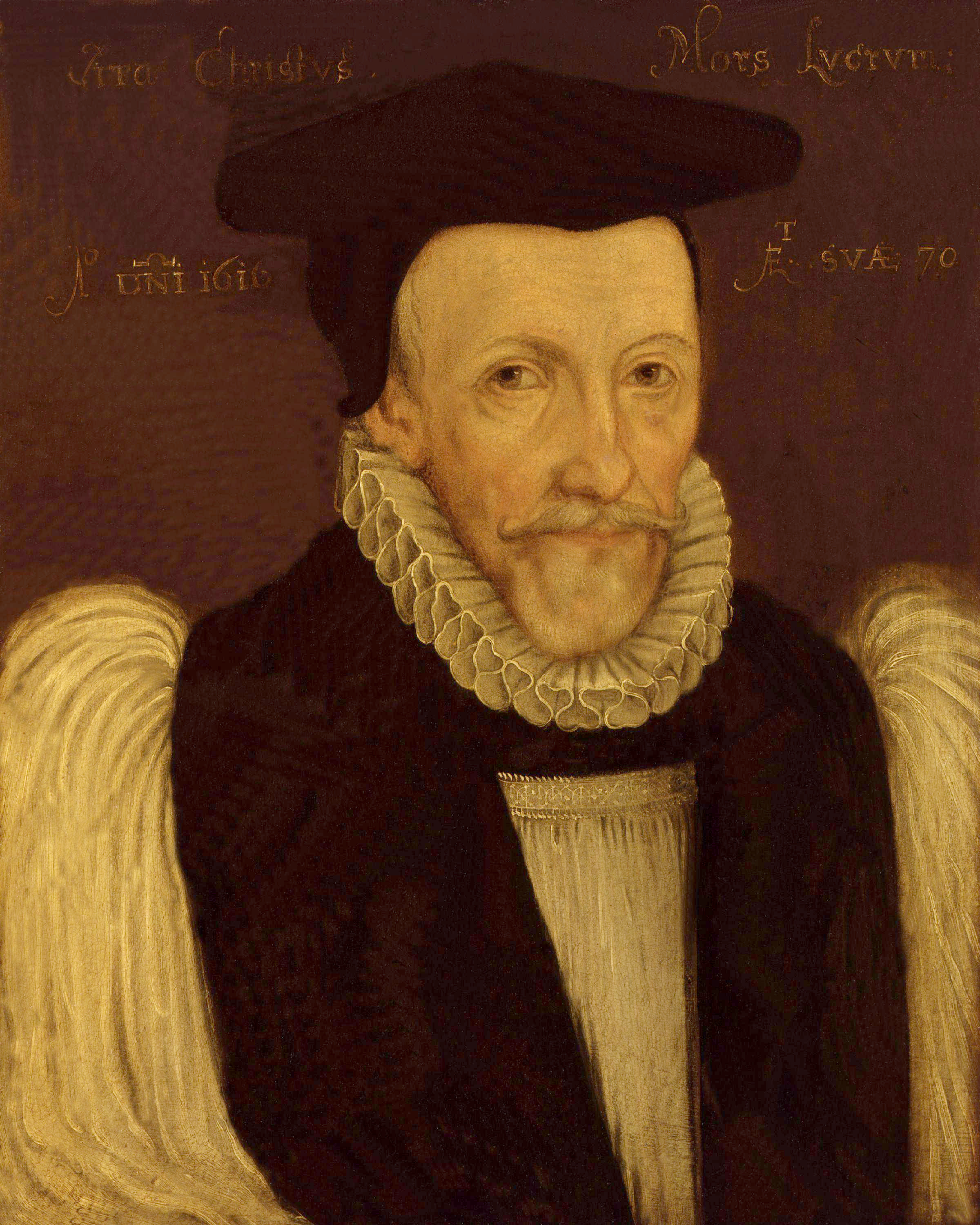
- official portrait as Archbishop (c. 1608)
- Installed: 1606
- Term ended: 1628 (death)
- Predecessor: Matthew Hutton
- Successor: George Montaigne
- Other posts: Public Orator of Oxford University (1569–1572); President of St John's College, Oxford (1572–1576); Dean of Christ Church (1576–1579); Vice-Chancellor of Oxford University (1579–1583); Dean of Durham (1583–1595); Bishop of Durham (1595–1606)

Personal details
- Born: Tobias Matthew; 13 June 1546 Bristol, England
- Died: 29 March 1628 (aged 81) Cawood, West Riding of Yorkshire, England
- Buried: York Minster
- Denomination: Church of England
- Parents: Sir John Matthew of Ross (1522–1569); Eleanor Crofton of Ludlow (1525–1546)
- Spouse: Frances Matthew (married 1576; he died 1628)
- Children: Tobias (1577–1655); Mary (1579–1583); Samuel (1583–1601); Mary Ann (1599–1666)
- Education: University College, Oxford; Christ Church, Oxford

Tobias Matthew (also Tobie and Toby; 13 June 1546 – 29 March 1628), was an Anglican bishop who was President of St John's College, Oxford, from 1572 to 1576, before being appointed Vice-Chancellor of Oxford University from 1579 to 1583, and Matthew would then become Dean of Durham from 1583 to 1595. All three positions, plus others, were appointed to Matthew by Elizabeth I. Eventually, he was appointed Archbishop of York in 1606 by Elizabeth's successor, James I.

== Early life ==
He was the son of Sir John Matthew of Ross in Herefordshire, England, and of his wife Eleanor Crofton of Ludlow. Tobias was born at Bristol on 13 June 1546.

Matthew was educated at Wells, Somerset, and then in succession at University College and Christ Church, Oxford. He proceeded BA in 1564, and MA in 1566.

== Ties to Elizabeth I ==
He attracted the favourable notice of Elizabeth I, and his rise was steady though not quite rapid. He was first appointed a public orator in Oxford in 1569, and then President of St John's in 1572, Dean of Christ Church in 1576, Vice-Chancellor of Oxford University in 1579, Dean of Durham in 1583, Bishop of Durham in 1595, and Archbishop of York in 1606.

After the Union of the Crowns, in June 1603 James VI and I sent his courtiers Roger Aston and James Hudson to give the Bishop his command to travel north to meet Anne of Denmark, who was bringing Prince Henry and Princess Elizabeth to Windsor Castle.

== Years as Archbishop ==
In 1581, Matthew had a controversy with the Jesuit Edmund Campion, and published at Oxford his arguments in 1638 under the title, Piissimi et eminentissimi viri Tobiae Matthew, archiepiscopi olim Eboracencis concio apologetica adversus Campianam. While in the north he was active in forcing the recusants to conform to the Church of England, preaching hundreds of sermons and carrying out thorough visitations.

In 1617, he delegated his trusted lieutenant Phineas Hodson to advise Roger Brearley, who had founded the Grindletonian nonconformist sect and been accused of heresy as a result, on how he might reconcile with the Church of England.

== Final years and death ==
During his later years he was to some extent in opposition to the administration of King James I. He was exempted from attendance in the parliament of 1625 on the ground of age and infirmities. His wife, Frances, was the daughter of William Barlow, Bishop of Chichester. His son, Tobie Matthew was an MP and later a convert to Roman Catholicism. Tobias died at Cawood on 29 March 1628 at 81 years old; he was buried in the Lady Chapel of York Minster.

Matthew left his fortune not to his sons or the church but to his wife Frances Matthew. Amongst his possessions were 600 books, valued then at £300 (approx £70,500 GBP in September 2025). Frances later give them all to York Minster. These books are the basis of the library (now at Old Palace, York). Frances had been his wife for over fifty years and she died the following year and was buried in York Minster's lady chapel.

== Arms ==
Coat of arms of Tobias Matthew

Notes
While serving as a bishop Matthew's arms would be displayed impaled with the arms of the diocese and topped by a mitre.
Escutcheon
Sable a lion rampant Argent.

Academic offices
Preceded by John Robinson	President of St John's College, Oxford; 1572–1577	Succeeded by Francis Wyllis
Preceded by John Piers	Dean of Christ Church, Oxford; 1577–1583	Succeeded by William James
Preceded by Martin Culpepper	Vice-Chancellor of Oxford University; 1579–1580	Succeeded by Arthur Yeldard
Church of England titles
Preceded by Thomas Wilson	Dean of Durham; 1583–1595	Succeeded by William James
Preceded by Matthew Hutton	Bishop of Durham; 1595–1606	Succeeded by William James
Preceded by Matthew Hutton	Archbishop of York; 1606–1628	Succeeded by George Montaigne
