= Tobie Matthew =

English politician

Sir Tobie Matthew
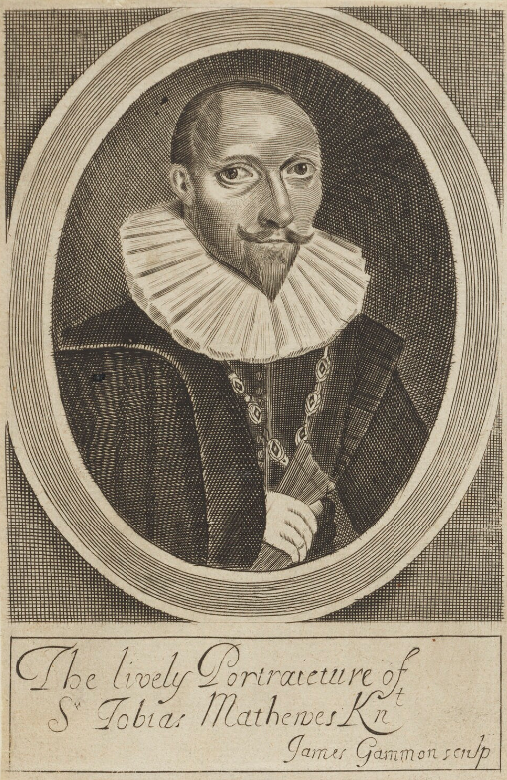
- in 1660
- Born: Tobias Matthew; 3 October 1577; Salisbury, Wiltshire, England
- Died: 13 October 1655 (aged 78); Ghent, County of Flanders
- Occupations: Member of Parliament (1599–1604); Royal Advisor to Elizabeth I (1599–1603) to James I (1603–1604 and 1622–1625) to Charles I & Queen Henrietta Maria (1625–1640)
- Years active: 1599–1640
- Known for: espionage for James I
- Parent(s): Tobias Matthew; Frances Matthew

Sir Tobie Matthew (also sometimes spelt Mathew; 3 October 1577 – 13 October 1655), born in Salisbury, was an English member of parliament and courtier who converted to Roman Catholicism and became a priest. He was sent to Spain to promote the proposed Spanish Match between Charles, Prince of Wales, and the Spanish Infanta, Maria Anna of Spain, for which mission he was knighted. He left England after being accused of leading Catholics in 1641 and retired to Ghent.

== Life ==
Matthew was the son of the benefactor Frances and Tobias Matthew, then Dean of Christ Church, later Bishop of Durham, and finally Archbishop of York, by his marriage to Frances, a daughter of William Barlow, Bishop of Chichester. Matthew matriculated from Christ Church on 13 March 1589/90 and graduated MA (Oxon) on 5 July 1597. He spent extravagantly as a young man, because of his large debts he is known to have received at different times the large sum of £14,000 from his father. On 15 May 1599, he was admitted a member of Gray's Inn, where he began his close friendship with Francis Bacon.

Two years later, Matthew was elected as Member of Parliament for Newport, in Cornwall. During this time, he was a frequent visitor to the court of Elizabeth I. In 1604, shortly after the accession of James I, Matthew was elected again to the House of Commons, this time by St Alban's (succeeding Bacon), and joined James's court. He also received a large grant from the Crown which provided for his future.

Having always desired to travel, Matthew left England in November 1604 and travelled through France to Florence, even though he had promised his father he would not go to Italy. In Florence, he met several Roman Catholics and converted to Catholicism from Anglicanism in 1606. At that time a new persecution of "Papists" was raging in England, but Matthew was determined to return. When he arrived, he was imprisoned in the Fleet for six months and every effort was made to make him recant his conversion. In 1608, he was allowed to leave England and travelled in Flanders and Spain. In 1614, whilst in the entourage of Thomas Howard, 21st Earl of Arundel, he studied for the priesthood at Rome and was ordained by Cardinal Bellarmine on 20 May.

In 1617, James allowed Matthew to return to England and he stayed for some time with Bacon. During this time he wrote an introduction to the Italian translation of his friend's Essays. Matthew was exiled again from 1619 to 1622 for refusing to take the oath of allegiance, but was favourably received by James upon his return. He acted as an agent at court to promote the marriage of Charles, Prince of Wales (later Charles I) with the Spanish Infanta, Maria Anna of Spain. For promoting this cause, the ill-fated "Spanish Match", James sent Matthew to Madrid and knighted him upon his return on 20 October 1623. As a member of the immediate circle of the new queen consort, Henrietta Maria, Matthew enjoyed the same favour at court under Charles I as he had under his father. Under a charming and playful guise—he offered to prepare for Henrietta Maria the new Spanish drink of chocolate, and did so, but absent-mindedly testing it, he tasted it all up— he laboured diligently for the Roman Catholic cause there. At the time of Anne Blount, Countess of Newport's conversion to his faith (which was considered scandalous), he was falsely accused of converting her, but others had actually assisted her. Matthew absented himself from the court.

When his father died in 1628 he left all his wealth to his wife Frances and when she died in 1629 she left Tobie a single diamond ring and the rest went in a large number of cash bequests and shares to her grandchildren, nieces and nephews.

After the Civil War broke out in 1640, Matthew was again falsely accused. By now in his sixties, he left England for the last time in 1641. He took refuge with the English Jesuits at their house at Ghent. Whilst he was there he became the spiritual adviser to the Abbess, Elizabeth Knatchbull, there. He admired her and wrote her biography that was later published in 1931. He died at the English College in Ghent, and was buried there.

Matthew has been described as a Jesuit, having been "received into the Society at an uncertain period before his death, possibly only upon his death-bed. That he died a Jesuit; at Ghent on 13 October 1655, aged 77, is certain".

== Works ==
Matthew's translations include:

- Augustine's Confessions (1620)
- the Autobiography of Teresa of Ávila (1623)
- Francisco Arias's Treatise of Patience (1650)

Matthew himself authored:

- A Relation of the death of Troilo Severe, Baron of Rome (1620)
- A Missive of Consolation sent from Flanders to the Catholics of England (1647)
- A True Historical Relation of the Conversion of Sir Tobie Matthew to the Holie Catholic Faith (first published in 1904)

A number of Matthew's unpublished manuscripts also survive. His letters were edited by John Donne the Younger in 1660.
