= Bath Place =

Bath Place may refer to:

- Bath Place, London
- Bath Place, Oxford
