= Henry Monson =

Henry Monson may refer to:

- Sir Henry Monson, 3rd Baronet (1653–1718), English politician
- Henry Monson (gaoler) (1793–1866), New Zealand settler
