= All Saints' Church, Cawood =

Church in Cawood, North Yorkshire, England

Coordinates: 53.8332°N 1.1236°W

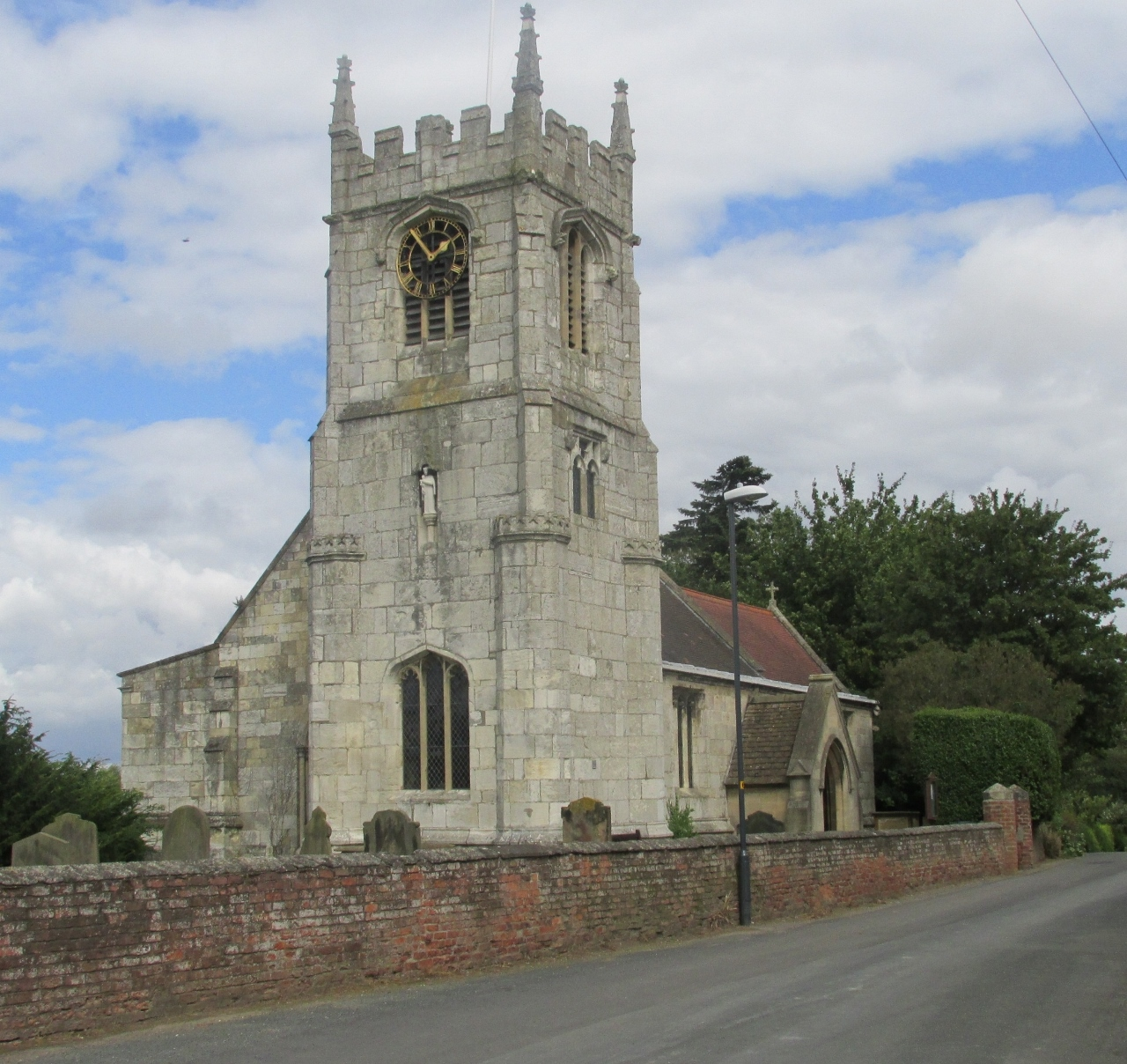
The church in 2014

All Saints' Church is the parish church of Cawood, in North Yorkshire, England.

== History ==
The oldest part of the church is the west wall, dating from the mid- or late-12th century. The chancel and south aisle were added in the 13th century. The church was first recorded in 1294, but is believed to have previously been a chapel of Cawood Castle. In the 14th century, a north aisle and north and south chapels were added. The following century, the north chapel was enlarged and the south chapel demolished, while a grand east window was inserted. The tower was also constructed; in 1848 the church was described as "a neat structure with a tower".

During the 1880s, the church was restored by George Gilbert Scott Jr. He replaced most of the glass, and removed a statue of the Virgin and Child from the tower for safekeeping. The statue was lost, and a copy installed only in 1961. In 1935, the south porch was rebuilt. The north aisle has been converted into a vestry. In 1966, the church was grade I listed.

== Architecture ==
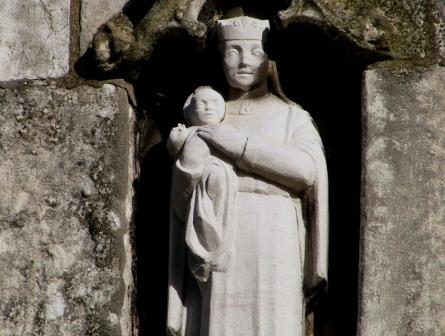
Detail of the Virgin and Child statue

The church is constructed of Magnesian Limestone, with a tiled roof. The nave has four bays, the chancel has two. The windows in the north aisle and chancel are Perpendicular, the east window having five lights. The windows on the south side are lancets, while the west end has an early but recut doorway. The south porch covers another original door. The tower, unusually at the southwest of the church, has three stages with angle buttresses. At ground level, there is a window with an ogee arch.

Inside the church is a memorial to George Montaigne, incorporating a life-size figure, dating to about 1623. There are also three fragments of mediaeval tomb slabs. In the churchyard is a stone with a cup-like hollow, believed to have been used for depositing donations for lepers.

== See also ==
- Grade I listed buildings in North Yorkshire (district)
- Listed buildings in Cawood
