= William Barlow (bishop of Chichester) =

English prior

- Bishop of Chichester
- Diocese: Diocese of Chichester
- In office: 1559 – 1568 (death)
- Predecessor: John Christopherson
- Successor: Richard Curteys
- Other posts: Bishop of St Asaph (1536); Bishop of St Davids (1536–1548); Bishop of Bath and Wells (1548–1553)

Orders
- Consecration: February 1535 or June 1536 by Thomas Cranmer

Personal details
- Born: William Barlow c. 1498 Essex, England
- Died: 13 August 1568 (aged c. 70 years) Chichester, Sussex, England
- Buried: Chichester Cathedral
- Denomination: Protestant
- Parents: Robert Barlow; Anna
- Spouse: Agatha Wellsborne (1505–1595)
- Children: William Barlow; John Barlow; Margaret Overton; Anne Westfaling; Antonia Wickham; Elizabeth Day; Frances Matthew

William Barlow (also spelled Barlowe; c. 1498 – 13 August 1568) was an English Augustinian prior turned bishop of four dioceses, a complex figure of the Protestant Reformation. Aspects of his life await scholarly clarification. Labelled by some a "weathercock reformer", he was in fact a staunch evangelical, an anti-Catholic and collaborator in the dissolution of the monasteries and dismantling of church estates; and largely consistent in his approach, apart from an early anti-Lutheran tract and a supposed recantation under Mary I. He was one of the four consecrators and the principal consecrator of Matthew Parker, as archbishop of Canterbury in 1559.

== Life ==
William Barlow was born in Essex around 1498 to Robert Barlow, merchant and deputy customs officer of Colchester and his wife Anna. Details of his childhood and early education are still unknown. Both Oxford and Cambridge Universities have laid claim to Barlow, but there is no extant evidence.

An Augustinian regular canon, he is first mentioned as prior of Bromehill Priory, Weeting, Norfolk in 1525. Before that he probably entered St Osyth's Priory, near Colchester, in about 1516. Many authorities have suggested that, before Bromehill, Barlow had 'headed some smaller houses', beginning as early as 1507. He may have used the surname, Finch, during this period at Tiptree and Leighs in Essex and Haverfordwest in Pembrokeshire, and Bisham in Berkshire. However, this is very unlikely as there is no contemporary evidence for these earlier appointments, nor that he ever used the name 'Finch'. This theory would also put his year of birth back to around 1480, which is nearly twenty years before the suggested date of 1498, a date supported by a claim that he was 60 years old in 1559. The confusion may have arisen as many accounts 'conflate the careers of two, three, or possibly four persons'. Bromehill Priory was dissolved by Cardinal Thomas Wolsey in 1528, and Barlow was granted a yearly pension of 40 shillings. Already by 1526 he was in contact with the literature of the Protestant reformers, and he may have been the courier who brought a work of Johannes Bugenhagen to Thomas More. After 1528, Barlow spent some time on the continent and became familiar with the reformist doctrines of Martin Luther and others, many of whom he met. He also experienced the new social organisation brought about by the reformers. His written account was published initially in 1531.

== Court circles ==
There is little factual evidence to suggest that Barlow played a major role in the Court of Henry VIII. The main reference linking him with a courtly position is contained in one of Henry's letters to James V of Scotland. This letter of October 1535 introduces "our trusty and right welbeloved Counsaillour Mr Barlowe, Clerke, Pryour of the Monastery of Bisham, being sufficiently instructed in the specialities of certain grete and weighty causes." Much has been made of his supposed involvement with the king's 'great matter'; his desire to rid himself of Queen Catherine by getting his marriage to her annulled. However, a careful study of all the available communications and other documents suggests that it was William's brother John Barlow who played the major role. It was certainly he who was closely associated with the Bullen (Boleyn) family, not William.

What is apparent is that William Barlow was appointed as prior of Haverfordwest Priory, in 1534; the position was in the gift of Anne Boleyn as Marchioness of Pembroke. He also suggested himself as a suffragan bishop in the Diocese of St Davids, a suggestion supported by John Barlow, but the bishop Richard Rawlins, soon to be a troublesome opponent, rejected him.

William experienced hostile opposition to his reformist ideas and teaching and, with the support of Thomas Cromwell, was moved from Haverfordwest and made prior of Bisham Priory in Berkshire. This he handed over to the king in 1536; but it was briefly a candidate to be upgraded to an abbey. His brothers Roger and Thomas Barlow were purchasers or grantees of Haverfordwest Priory in 1546, after its dissolution in 1536. Roger Barlow was married and founded the Barlow family of Slebech. He had been a merchant and a companion of Sebastian Cabot voyaging to South America; Thomas Barlow remained unmarried and was rector of Catfield.

== Missions to Scotland ==
William Barlow, then Prior of the Monastery of Bisham, was sent to Scotland in October 1534. He went again to James V of Scotland with William Howard in February 1536. Barlow wrote to Cromwell discussing the miseries of the English border people who were not well served by the judiciary, and compared their situation to the rule of a corrupt Abbot whose officers live in luxury and support his power whilst the brothers live in grievous wretchedness. In Edinburgh, Barlow encountered the suspicions of the King's Catholic advisors, who feared he had come to preach or take away Henry VIII's sister Margaret Tudor. Howard in his letter of 25 April 1536 referred to Barlow as 'My Lord of Saint David,' and regretted that Barlow could not advise him during his meeting with James V at Stirling Castle on Good Friday.

Howard and Barlow were in Edinburgh in May 1536, and learnt of a plan for James V to marry his mistress Margaret Erskine although they thought it was 'against the heart of all his nobles.' They heard that James had sent a messenger to Pope Paul III asking him to forbid James to meet Henry VIII. Barlow stayed in Scotland some days after Howard's return at request of Margaret Tudor, and he joked to Cromwell that it would be no more unpleasant to leave Edinburgh than for Lot to pass out of Sodom.

== Bishop in Wales ==
In 1536, he was successively Bishop of St Asaph and then Bishop of St Davids. His appointment at St Asaph was made during his absence on a diplomatic mission to James V, with William Howard and Robert Ferrar. Some historians have argued that he must not have been consecrated because there is no direct reference to it in the archbishop's register. However, that register does record his election as bishop, the royal assent to it and his confirmation. Moreover, "the (separate) record of his consecration may easily have been lost or stolen", as clearly happened on other occasions. His consecration as a bishop is important in the issue of the validity of the Church of England's claim to have maintained the apostolic succession of bishops. These were condemned as null and void by Leo XIII in 1896: the following year the archbishops of England replied in Saepius Officio. Barlow was one of four consecrators, and the principal one, of Matthew Parker (John Hodgkins was also a co-consecrator of Parker; he was consecrated bishop on 9 December 1537, by John Stokesley of London, Robert Parfew of St Asaph and John Hilsey of Rochester, two of whom, Stokesley and Parfew, were Roman Catholic prelates recognized by the Pope; Scory and Coverdale, the other two, had been consecrated using the English Ordinal of 1550 - each of the four men who consecrated Parker had been consecrated by men with the Roman Pontifical before or after the break with Rome - Stokely and Cranmer were consecrated in 1530 and 1532 before the break with the Rome). As bishop, he was also a Lord Spiritual of the House of Lords. However, the Lambeth Registers (ff. 179–182) mention that he was elected in 1535 and his consecration took place on 22 February 1535, while Henry Wharton in his Anglia Sacra states that he was consecrated on 23 February 1535.

He was involved in quarrels with his chapter, who sent up a series of articles addressed to the President of the Council of Wales, denouncing him as a heretic. Nevertheless, he carried on a campaign against relics, pilgrimages, saint-worship, and other Catholic practices. He tried to suppress the cult of Saint David in St Davids Cathedral. The statue of Our Lady of Cardigan, at St Dogmaels Abbey was a particular target, mentioned in his correspondence with Cromwell; the abbey was suppressed in 1536.

In despair of the western district around St Davids, he sought to transfer his see to relatively central Carmarthen. He established the later custom of the bishops residing at Abergwili, a village within two miles of Carmarthen; but the see did not move. He alienated the rich manor of Lamphey from the see. He tried to maintain a free grammar school at Carmarthen, and succeeded in obtaining the grant of some suppressed religious houses for the foundation of Christ College, Brecon, and of a grammar school there (19 January 1542).

Barlow also took part in general ecclesiastical politics. He signed the articles drawn up in 1536. He shared in composing the Institution of the Christian Man, and supported the translation of the Bible. He vainly tried to substitute a milder policy for the Six Articles of 1539. Extreme Erastianism, which maintained that simple appointment by the monarch was enough, without episcopal consecration, to constitute a lawful bishop, he shared with Thomas Cranmer. But the other opinions he maintained—that confession was not enjoined by Scripture; that there were just three sacraments; that laymen were as competent to excommunicate heretics as bishops or priests; that purgatory was a delusion—were extreme and incautious for the end of Henry VIII's reign. At this period he was one of Cranmer's few close allies on the evangelical wing of the bishops: they two with Hugh Latimer were the main clerical supporters of humanist education, and with Thomas Goodrich were the most advanced reformers on some matters of doctrine. In 1547 he supported Cranmer's Homilies campaign, preaching at St Paul's Cross, early in the new reign.

== Bath and Wells ==
Early in the reign of Edward VI Barlow commended himself to Edward Seymour, 1st Duke of Somerset by preaching against images. In 1548, he was translated to become Bishop of Bath and Wells. On 20 May of the same year he sold to the Duke seven manors, together with the Bishop's Palace, Wells, and other estates and profits of jurisdiction belonging to the see, for, it is said, £2000; of this he appears to have received £400. Bath Place and the Minories went to the Duke's brother, Thomas Seymour, 1st Baron Seymour of Sudeley. He also sold the lead from the great hall at the Bishops Palace. Barlow himself was lodged in the deanery. Finding that Dean Goodman had annexed the prebend of Wiveliscombe, Barlow deprived him. The dean in return attempted to prove him guilty of praemunire, the deanery being a royal donative. Barlow had to accept the king's pardon, but the deprivation stood. Barlow was in complete sympathy with the rulers and reformers of the time, but Cranmer did not trust him.

He was now married to Agatha Wellesbourne. This marriage or relationship apparently anticipated the formal lifting of the requirement of clerical celibacy; the subsequent tradition around the large family of the Barlows has been attributed to compensatory apologetics.

== Later life ==
When Mary I of England came to the throne Barlow resigned his bishopric, either because he was married, or because of his extreme Reformist views. After imprisonment in the Tower of London he fled overseas, becoming a Marian exile. He probably landed at the little seaport of Emden in Northern Germany, where another refugee bishop, John Scory was minister. The long-held view that Barlow was the minister in Emden is based, not on any contemporary evidence, but on a book written about 100 years later by Thomas Fuller. By the end of 1555, Barlow had joined the party of Catherine Willoughby, 12th Baroness Willoughby de Eresby and Richard Bertie in Wessl, where he was elected pastor of the small English congregation there. A year later, however, following disagreements between the English and the local council, the Countess and her husband left, taking Barlow with them, and travelled to Weinheim where they were offered refuge. An envoy sent by Queen Mary caught up with them. He carried documents which Barlow insisted on seeing to find out if they were letters or orders to return. After further discussions, the envoy was neither able to persuade nor coerce the party to return to England. From Weinheim, the group travelled on to Poland. It is likely that Barlow's wife and children were with him in exile; Agatha Barlow's memorial in St Mary's Church, Easton in Hampshire, clearly states that she was "A Companione with him in Banishmente."

Under Elizabeth I he was bishop of Chichester. Almost immediately she compelled him by Act of Parliament to give up manors, including Selsey.

== Works ==
It has been argued that pamphlets by Friar Jerome Barlow (or Barlowe) were by William Barlow. Scholars remain divided on the issue. It may be that the independent work of both men has been compounded as that of a single author

A work A dialogue describing the originall ground of these Lutheran faccions, and many of their abuses from 1531, printed by William Rastell, was reissued in 1553. It takes Martin Luther to be a heretic, and in it Barlow explains that contact with Lutherans had led into a temporary apostasy. George Joye accused Thomas More of being the real author.

== Family ==
His five daughters each married clergymen who were to become bishops:

- Anne to Herbert Westfaling, Bishop of Hereford;
- Elizabeth to William Day, Bishop of Winchester;
- Margaret to William Overton, Bishop of Lichfield;
- Frances, after her first husband Parker's death, to Tobias Matthew, Archbishop of York; and
- Antonia to William Wickham, Bishop of Winchester.

Two sons lived to maturity:

- William Barlow (1544–1625), writer on magnetism was his eldest son;
- John Barlow (1549–1634), a gentleman of Petersfield, Hampshire. He was employed as a surveyor of woodland by the Dean and Chapter of Winchester Cathedral.

His wife Agatha died in 1595; there is a memorial to her in Easton, Hampshire.

== Notes ==
Church of England titles
Preceded by Henry Standish	Bishop of St Asaph; 1535–1536	Succeeded by Robert Warton
Preceded by Richard Rawlins	Bishop of St Davids; 1536–1549	Succeeded by Robert Ferrar
Preceded by William Knight	Bishop of Bath and Wells; 1548–1553	Succeeded by Gilbert Bourne
Preceded by John Christopherson	Bishop of Chichester; 1559–1568	Succeeded by Richard Curteys
