= Cawood Bridge =

Bridge over the River Ouse in Yorkshire, England

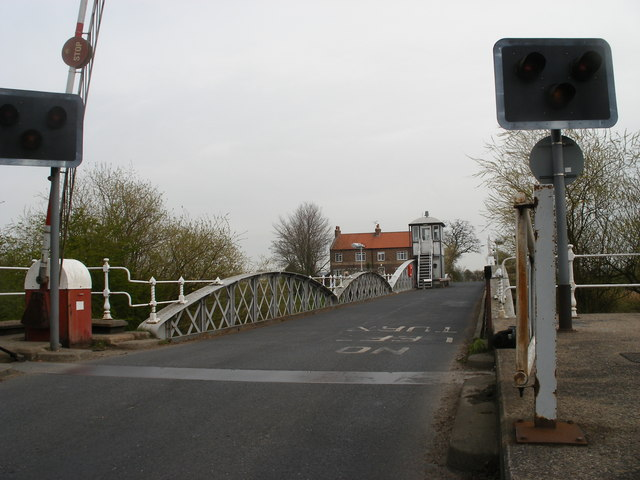
- Coordinates: 53°50′01″N 1°07′42″W
- Carries: B1222 road
- Crosses: River Ouse
- Locale: Cawood, North Yorkshire
- Heritage status: Grade II listed

Characteristics
- Design: Swing bridge
- Total length: 295 feet (90 m)

History
- Opened: 31 July 1872

Cawood Bridge is a swing bridge which spans the Yorkshire River Ouse in North Yorkshire, England. Construction was authorised in 1870, with the formation of the Cawood Bridge Company. It was opened on 31 July 1872 to replace the ferry, and is located about halfway between Naburn and Selby. It is the only bridge from the village of Cawood that crosses the river. It is Grade II listed.

== History ==
The local population at Cawood considered the ferry crossing to be slow and, sometimes even dangerous. The Cawood Bridge Act 1870 (33 & 34 Vict. c. lxv), authorised a bridge to replace the ferry crossing. The bridge was opened in July 1872 at a cost of £12,000. It has five spans, two of which are the swing section and extends to 295 feet (90 m), even though the width of the river at the bridge's location is 50 yards (46 m).

== Operations ==
The bridge, whose maintenance is the responsibility of North Yorkshire County Council, had a weight limit of 7.5 tonnes (8.3 tons) until 2017, when extra strengthening work was undertaken raising the weight limit to 10 tonnes (11 tons). CCTV cameras are installed to monitor traffic not adhering to the weight limit or red lights, and to allow officials to see traffic in both directions. It is the policy of the county council to prosecute any overweight vehicle, or vehicle jumping the red lights, caught on CCTV. Previous fines have been as much as £900. Crossing vehicles used to be charged a toll, but this system was scrapped in 1882, when the North Riding County Council bought the bridge.

The bridge has experienced numerous problems, due partly to its age, but mainly due to the increasing numbers of heavy goods vehicles and heavily laden farm vehicles using the bridge and causing damage, especially when they have loads in excess of the maximum gross weight (MGW). Issues have included the locking pin falling out of place, cracks forming in the supporting structure, and jamming of the swing mechanism, which has caused heavy traffic delays and tailbacks.

== 2003 closure ==
In October 2003, the bridge was closed for five days for urgent repair work, after a vehicle collided with a safety barrier.

Later inspection discovered that the York end of the bridge was about to fail due to three large cracks in one of the supporting steel plates, which ran the full length of the bridge. River traffic was halted, and new plates were fitted within hours, as a temporary measure.

Permanent repairs involved a steel plate, twice the thickness of the original, being fitted along the entire deck.

== 2015 floods ==
In late December 2015, heavy rainfall led to flooding across large parts of northern England and Wales. The Ouse at Cawood flowed over the deck of the bridge.

== See also ==
- Listed buildings in Cawood
- Listed buildings in Kelfield, North Yorkshire

Bridges over the River Ouse
Upstream: Naburn railway bridge	Downstream: Selby toll bridge
