= William Barlow (archdeacon of Salisbury) =

Welsh churchman and scientist

William Barlow or Barlowe (died 1625) was a Welsh churchman and scientist.

== Life ==
Son of William Barlow and Agatha Wellesbourne, he was born at St David's when his father was bishop of that diocese, and was educated at Balliol College, Oxford. He graduated B. A. in 1564. About 1573 he entered into holy orders, and was made a prebendary of Winchester (1581) and rector of Easton.

In 1588, while maintaining his position at Winchester, Barlow began an association with Lichfield as prebend of Colwich, which in the following year was transferred to the 'golden prebend' of Sawley with which came the position of treasurer of Lichfield Cathedral. He afterwards became a chaplain to Henry Frederick, Prince of Wales, son of King James I, and finally archdeacon of Salisbury (1615).

Barlow died 25 May 1625, and was buried in the chancel of his church at Easton. His 1617 will gives his wife's name as Julyan and children's names: William, Thomas, Barnaby, Anne, Mary, and Katherine.

== Works ==
His works are:

- The Navigator's Supply, London, 1597;
- Magnetical Advertisements concerning the nature and property of the Loadstone, London, 1618;
- A Brief Discovery of the Idle Animadversions of Mark Ridley, M.D., London, 1618.

Barlow's work was on practical aspects of magnetism: improvements in the hanging of compasses at sea, for the discovery of the difference between iron and steel for magnetic purposes, and for the proper way of touching magnetic needles, and of piercing and cementing lodestones. He corresponded with William Gilbert. A controversy arose between Barlow and Mark Ridley, who published a reply to Barlow's Magnetical Advertisements, charging him with plagiarism, not only of Gilbert's work De Magnete (1600), but of his own book, Magnetical Bodies and Motions (1613). Barlow made a stinging reply. The work had in fact its origins in a manuscript he had prepared in 1609 for Sir Thomas Chaloner; Chaloner may have found him the position as chaplain to Prince Henry.
