= Kelfield, North Yorkshire =

Village and civil parish in North Yorkshire, England

Coordinates: 53.838468°N 1.100492°W

Kelfield
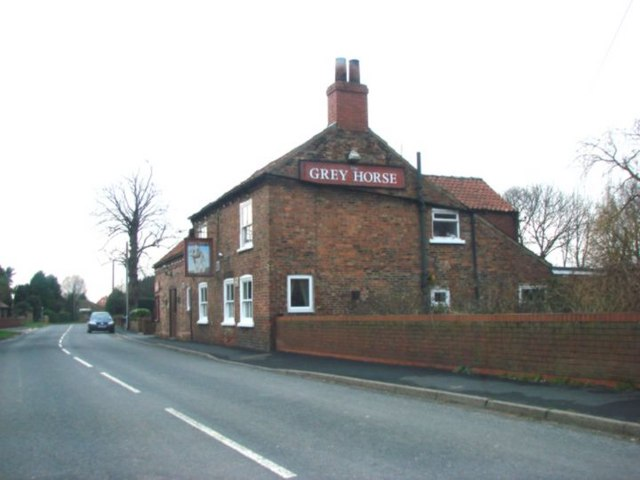
- The Grey Horse, Kelfield

- Location within North Yorkshire
- Population: 497 (2011 census)
- OS grid reference: SE592383
  - London: 165 mi (266 km) S
- Unitary authority: North Yorkshire
- Ceremonial county: North Yorkshire
- Region: Yorkshire and the Humber
- Country: England
- Sovereign state: United Kingdom
- Post town: York
- Postcode district: YO19
- Dialling code: 01757
- Police: North Yorkshire
- Fire: North Yorkshire
- Ambulance: Yorkshire
- UK Parliament: Selby

Kelfield is a small village and civil parish in the county of North Yorkshire, England. The village is situated on the northern bank of the River Ouse, equidistant between the villages of Riccall, Cawood and Stillingfleet, approximately 5 miles (8 km) north-west of Selby.

It was historically part of the East Riding of Yorkshire until 1974. From 1974 to 2023 it was part of the Selby District, it is now administered by the unitary North Yorkshire Council.

== History ==
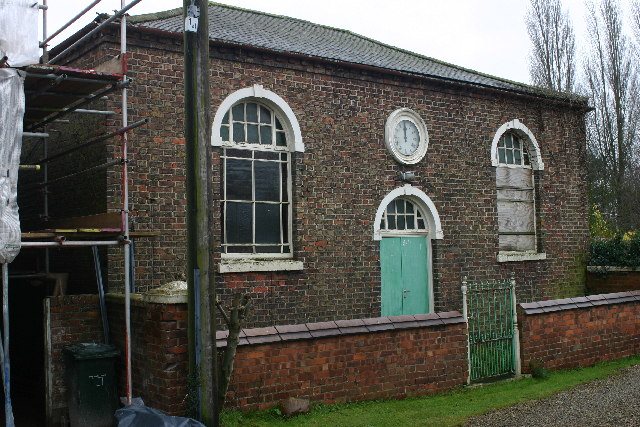
Kelfield chapel

The name Kelfield derives from the Old English celcefeld meaning 'chalk field'.

Kelfield is recorded in the Domesday Book (1086) as Chelchefelt,'an estate of one carucate and seven bovates... The estate of Hugh son of Baldric had land for one plough, and four villeins had a plough there.'

In 1823 Kelfield was a township in the civil parish of Stillingfleet, in the East Riding of Yorkshire and the Wapentake of Ouse and Derwent. A public school existed for the benefit of poor children. Population at the time was 286, with occupations including a schoolteacher, nine farmers, a tailor, a butcher, two carpenters – one of whom was a gunsmith, the other a shopkeeper – and the landlord of the Boot and Shoe public house, who was also a shoemaker. There was an Esquire at the Hall, and three yeomen.

A prophetess arrived in Kelfield in the summer of 1833. The Yorkshire and national newspapers were gripped by the story of a young girl called Hannah Beedham who became known as the 'Kelfield Prophetess'. Whilst staying at James Sturdy's home in Kelfield, Hannah described having a vision where she was told the date of her death. Thousands of people flocked to Kelfield to be 'in at the death'. The newspapers reported Hannah Beedham's exploits with growing cynicism and glee when she failed to die as promised on 1 August 1833 at 9.00 pm. She had laid herself out in state in James Sturdy's Kelfield parlour, and thousands of curious people from all over Yorkshire filed past, in the hope of seeing a miracle. When she did not pass away, Sturdy must have wondered how to extricate himself from the embarrassing situation. Hannah died a few years later aged only 27 years. There is a record of Hannah's burial in an unmarked grave on Christmas Eve 1839, at Holy Trinity Church, Goodramgate, York.

Her obituary in the Yorkshire Gazette on 28 December 1839 read: 'On Monday twenty-third of December in Bedern in this city HANNAH WHITE formerly Hannah Beedham the fanatic who prophesied her own death a few years ago and created such a sensation in this city and its vicinity to induce a large number of persons to make a pilgrimage to Kelfield in order to witness its accomplishment. Shortly after her strange prediction she got married and has left two young children. Her closing days have been passed in distress and poverty.'

== Amenities ==
The village no longer has a school, church or shops, but is served by the local villages of Riccall and Cawood, with secondary school children travelling to Barlby High School. Amenities include the Grey Horse public house, the village institute and the cricket club.

== See also ==
- Listed buildings in Kelfield, North Yorkshire
