= Frances Matthew =

English benefactor of York Minster (1550 – 1629)

- Born: Frances Barlow; 1550
- Died: 1629 (aged 78–79)
- Other name: Frances Parker
- Known for: Founding a library collection
- Spouses: Matthew Parker (married 1569–1575); Tobias Matthew, Archbishop of York (married 1576)
- Children: 5, including Tobias (1577–1655); Mary (1579–1583); Samuel (1583–1601); Mary Ann (1599–1666)
- Parents: William Barlow, Bishop of Chichester (father); Agatha Wellsborne (mother)

Frances Matthew, born Frances Barlow, also known as Frances Parker (1550 – 1629), was an English benefactor of York Minster. Her father, her first father-in-law, her second husband and her sister's husbands were bishops.

== Life ==
She was the daughter of Agatha (born Wellsborne) and William Barlow, Bishop of Chichester. Her father was said to have been the first bishop to marry and her mother was a religious woman and it was a rumour that she was once a nun. Children of clergy were a novelty and they would have been called "priest's bastards" by conservative commentators.

She married Matthew Parker who was the son of Matthew Parker, Archbishop of Canterbury on 29 December 1569. Her father had been one of the four consecrators and the principal consecrator of the Archbishop of Canterbury in 1559. Her husband died in 1575 leaving her pregnant. The child was born and was also called Matthew but he died too within months.

After her first husband's death she married Tobias Matthew, the Archbishop of York. Their son, Tobie Matthew was an MP and later a convert to Roman Catholicism.

Her husband, Tobias, left his fortune not to his sons or the church but to his wife. Amongst his possessions were 600 books and they were valued then at £300 and Frances give them all to York Minster. These books are the basis of the library (now at Old Palace, York). Frances had been his wife for over fifty years and she died the following year and she was buried in York Minster's lady chapel.
