= Listed buildings in Kelfield, North Yorkshire =

Kelfield is a civil parish in the county of North Yorkshire, England. It contains three listed buildings that are recorded in the National Heritage List for England. All the listed buildings are designated at Grade II, the lowest of the three grades, which is applied to "buildings of national importance and special interest". The parish contains the village of Kelfield and the surrounding countryside, and the listed buildings consist of two farmhouses and a bridge.

== Buildings ==
Name and location	Photograph	Date	Notes
Corner Farmhouse; 53.83877°N 1.09676°W		Early 18th century (probable)	The farmhouse is in brick, with a floor band, a dentilled eaves band, and a swept pantile roof with brick coping and tumbled brickwork on the gable ends. There are two storeys and three bays. The central doorway has pilasters, a decorative fanlight, a frieze and a dentilled hood. The windows are casements under elliptical arches.
Village Farmhouse; 53.83857°N 1.10166°W	—	Mid 18th century	The farmhouse is in pinkish-brown brick, with a floor band, and an overhanging pantile roof with tumbled brickwork on the gable ends. There are two storeys and three bays. The central doorway has pilasters, a decorative fanlight, a frieze and a hood. The windows are sashes under elliptical arches.
Cawood Bridge; 53.83374°N 1.12818°W		1872	A swing bridge carrying the B1222 road over the River Ouse, it is in iron, and consists of five bays of segmental-arched girders with lattice work and railings. The middle span is the largest, and it revolves on a large disc supported by eight columns. The central piers have timber cutwaters, and on the bridge are iron lamps on wooden buttressing.
