= Richard Curteys =

English churchman

Richard Curteys (Note: Also Curtis or Coortess)(c.1532?–1582) was an English churchman. A native of Lincolnshire, after his education at St. John's, Cambridge he was ordained and eventually became Chaplain to Queen Elizabeth I. He was made the Dean of Chichester Cathedral and then Bishop of Chichester. Curteys was reputedly a promoter of preaching and the clerical improvement of Anglicanism. In Curteys' episcopate, the cost of supporting many residentiaries and providing hospitality, could not be funded by the relatively small income of Chichester Cathedral. Curteys remodelled the constitution to reduce costs. Despite the changes Curteys died penniless.

== Life ==
He was born in Lincolnshire, and educated at St. John's College, Cambridge, where he was elected to a scholarship in 1550. He proceeded B.A. in 1553, was elected a Fellow in 1553, and commenced M.A. in 1556. During the reign of Mary I of England he remained unaffected. He was appointed Senior Fellow of his College on 22 July 1559. In 1563 he was elected one of the Proctors of the university. When Queen Elizabeth visited Cambridge in August 1564, he made a congratulatory oration in Latin to Sir William Cecil, Chancellor of the university, on his arrival at St. John's College, and as Proctor he took part in the disputation before the Queen. In 1565 he proceeded B.D., and made a complaint against Richard Longworth, the Master of his College, and William Fulke one of the fellows, for non-conformity.

He was appointed Dean of Chichester about November 1566, and installed in March 1567. Around that he was Chaplain to the Queen and Archbishop Matthew Parker. In 1569 it was suggested that he should become the Archbishop of York, but Archbishop Parker favoured Edmund Grindal. In the same year he was created D.D. by the University of Cambridge, being admitted in the Jerusalem Chamber at Westminster, by the Dean Gabriel Goodman.

On the death of William Barlow, Bishop of Chichester, Archbishop Parker wrote to Sir William Cecil recommending Curteys for the vacant see. He was eventually elected to it, though not until April 1570. On 11 April 1571 he was presented by the Queen to the vicarage of Ryhall, with the members in Rutland.

During Curteys epicopate, revenues from Chichester Cathedral were described as "very small" and the profits were distributed to "a multitude of residentiaries". Accordingly, between the years 1573-74 the constitution was changed to save money and the amount of residentiaries reduced to five (including the dean).

His time as Bishop of Chichester was troubled. He engaged in a lawsuit with the Lord High Admiral with respect to wrecks on the coast. (Note: Henry VI granted that coast-lands of Chichester Cathedral should be exempt from the Court of the Admiralty in the matter of wrecks. This was confirmed in a deed of exchange of 1562.)In March 1577 he held a visitation, and cited and questioned the gentry of his diocese who were suspected Catholic sympathizers: about absenting themselves from divine service; of sending letters and money to, or receiving letters from Roman Catholic fugitives; or of possessing the books of Thomas Harding and other Roman Catholic authors. Three of the principal gentry involved complained, and commissioners prescribed conditions for his observance. In June 1577 he was obliged to procure a testimonial that he was not drunk at a private house. In 1579 he was called upon to deprive his brother Edmund of the vicarage of Cuckfield and of a canonry in Chichester as "a lewd vicar, void of all learning, a scoffer at singing of psalms, a seeker to witches, a drunkard, &c." The Bishop ducked the task, and subsequently the Bishop of London was directed to proceed to the deprivation of the delinquent. Another incident involving his intolerance to different faiths, he visited Joachim Gans who in speaking "in the Hebrue tonge," proclaimed himself a Jew. Bishop Curteys asked Gans, “Do you deny Jesus Christ to be the Son of God?" Gans replied, "What needeth the almighty God to have a son? Is He not almighty?"

He died in August 1582, very poor and greatly in debt to the Queen. He was buried in Chichester Cathedral. The see remained vacant until January 1586.

== Works ==
In addition to sermons preached before the queen and at St. Paul's Cross, he published An Exposition of certain Wordes of S. Paule to the Romaynes, entitled by an old writer, Hugo, a Treatise of the Workes of thre Dayes. Also another Worke of the Truthe of Christes naturall Bodye, London, 1577, 8vo; a translation. It had a preface, signed by about forty preachers, commending him for the good he had done in his diocese, especially by suppressing "Machevils, papists, libertines, atheists, and such other erroneous persons."

A treatise by him, An Corpus Christi sit ubique? and his translation from English into Latin of the first part of Bishop John Jewel's answer to Thomas Harding's Confutation are among the manuscripts in the British Museum (Royal Collection, 8 D. vii., articles 1 & 2).

== Notes ==
Church of England titles
Preceded by William Barlow vacancy from 1568	Bishop of Chichester; 1571–1582	Succeeded by vacancy to 1586; Thomas Bickley
