= Listed buildings in Cawood =

Cawood is a civil parish in the county of North Yorkshire, England. It contains 30 listed buildings that are recorded in the National Heritage List for England. Of these, three are listed at Grade I, the highest of the three grades, two are at Grade II*, the middle grade, and the others are at Grade II, the lowest grade. The parish contains the village of Cawood and the surrounding area. All the listed buildings are in the village, and most of these are houses, cottages and associated structures. The other listed buildings include the two surviving parts of a fortified medieval palace, a church, a former mill and a former school, both converted into houses, a farmhouse and an associated barn, a group of almshouses, a swing bridge and a telephone kiosk.

== Key ==
Grade	Criteria
I	Buildings of exceptional interest, sometimes considered to be internationally important
II*	Particularly important buildings of more than special interest
II	Buildings of national importance and special interest

== Buildings ==
Name and location	Photograph	Date	Notes	Grade
All Saints' Church; 53.83326°N 1.12355°W		12th century	The church has been altered and expanded through the centuries, and is built in magnesian limestone, with a tile roof to the church and stone slates on the porch. It consists of a nave, north and south aisles, a south porch, a chancel with a north vestry, and a southwest tower. The tower has three stages, string courses, and polygonal clasping buttresses with cresting at the top of the lowest stage, above which they are diagonal. On the west side is a three-light window, above which is a crocketed niche containing a statue. The bell openings have three lights, on the west side is a clock face, and above is an embattled parapet with crocketed corner pinnacles. The west doorway is Norman, with two orders of shafts and waterleaf capitals, and the south door has a round double-chamfered arch. The east window has five lights in Perpendicular style.	I
Banqueting Hall, Cawood Castle; 53.83228°N 1.12913°W		1426–52	A remaining part of a fortified medieval palace, it is in dark pink brick with magnesian limestone dressings, and has a swept pantile roof. There are two storeys and eight bays. The bays are divided by buttresses, and the windows are lancets with cusped heads. On the front are a doorway with a four-centred arched head and a cart entrance.	I
Gatehouse, Cawood Castle; 53.83240°N 1.12933°W		1426–52	The remaining gatehouse of a fortified medieval palace, it is in magnesian limestone, with angle buttresses, a coved cornice, and an embattled parapet. There are three storeys and a single bay, and a stair turret. In the ground floor is a carriage arch with enriched spandrels and a hood mould. The middle stage contains a canted oriel window with heraldic shields in the panelled base, and a stone slate roof with ornamental cresting, and in the top stage is a two-light window with a hood mould. At the rear are a pedestrian and a carriage archway, each with a four-centred arch, both under a large segmental arch with a cornice. Above is an oriel window carried on three shields, and a two-light window with a hood mould.	I
3 Market Place; 53.83279°N 1.12978°W	—	16th century (probable)	The house, at one time a shop, probably has a timber-framed core, it is encased in reddish-brown brick, rendered and whitewashed, and has a pantile roof. There are two storeys and two bays. The doorway is flanked by casement windows, and in the upper floor are horizontally-sliding sashes.	II
Mill Race Cottage; 53.83316°N 1.12916°W	—	16th century (probable)	The house, at one time a shop, has a timber-framed core, it is encased in reddish-brown brick, rendered and colourwashed, on a plinth, and has a swept pantile roof. There are two storeys, two bays, and rear outshuts under a catslide roof. In the left bay is a shop window with pilasters and a hood on fluted brackets. To the right is a doorway with a boot scraper on its right, and the other windows are horizontally-sliding sashes.	II
The Grange; 53.83049°N 1.12584°W		Mid 17th century	The house, which incorporates earlier material, is partly timber framed, the rest is in orange-red brick, with floor bands, a dentilled moulded cornice, a pantile roof with brick-capped kneelers and gable ends, and a curvilinear gable on the rear wing. There are two storeys and an L-shaped plan, with a front range of three bays, a rear wing, and two outshuts. On the front is a two-storey pedimented porch with an elliptical entrance, side seats inside, and an internal doorway. The windows on the front are sashes with alternate proud and flush voussoirs, and elsewhere there are mullioned windows.	II*
Station Farmhouse; 53.83065°N 1.13404°W	—	Mid to late 17th century (probable)	The house, which was later altered and extended, is in reddish-brown brick on a moulded plinth, with a modillion eaves cornice, and a pantile roof with stone kneelers and the remains of gable coping. There are two storeys, three bays, a rear range and an outshut on the right. The doorway has engaged pilasters rising to the upper floor, and a hood. The windows are sashes, those in the ground floor horizontally-sliding, and those in the upper floor with elliptical arches.	II
Yew Tree House and Cottage; 53.83183°N 1.12579°W		Mid to late 17th century	A house and later stables, later two houses, in brick with stone dressings, floor bands, and a pantile roof with Dutch gables. There are two storeys and an attic, a front of three bays, and at the rear is a stair tower, and two two-storey outshuts, one linking with the two-storey three-bay former stable block. On the front is a two-storey porch with a moulded pediment, containing a segmental-arched entrance. The windows on the front are sashes, some horizontally-sliding. In the left gable end is a blocked mullioned window.	II*
2 Thorpe Lane; 53.83246°N 1.12950°W	—	Late 17th century (probable)	The house, which has been altered, is in brown brick with stone dressings, a floor band, and a swept pantile roof. There are two storeys and attics, four bays, two rear stair turrets, and an outshut. Steps lead to a central porch with pilasters and an entablature, containing a double doorway with a fanlight. The windows are sashes, those in the lower two floors with wedge lintels, and in the roof are four gabled dormers.	II
6 High Street; 53.83308°N 1.12932°W	—	Late 17th to early 18th century	A house with a possible timber framed core, in reddish-brown brick, rendered and colourwashed on the front, the lower part with white glazed brick, projecting on the left, and roof of pantile and tile. There are two storeys, two bays, and a continuous rear outshut. In the centre is a doorway with an elliptical arch. One of the windows is a casement, and the others are horizontally-sliding sashes.	II
18 High Street; 53.83323°N 1.12896°W	—	Late 17th to early 18th century	A house and a shop in reddish-brown brick, rendered and whitewashed on the front, with a hipped pantile roof. There are two storeys, and an L-shaped plan, with a front range of four bays, a rear wing, and later infill under a catslide roof. On the front is a doorway with a shop window to the right under a cornice, and elsewhere are sash windows. In the rear wing is a moulded floor band and cogged eaves.	II
Mill House; 53.83266°N 1.13012°W	—	c. 1720	A mill converted into a house, it is in brown mottled brick with red brick dressings, on a plinth, with a parapet and a pantile roof. There are two storeys and seven bays, and an outshut on the left. Steps lead up to a central doorway. The windows are a mix of casements and horizontally-sliding sashes, many openings are blocked, and in the parapet are seven blind panels.	II
Don Juan; 53.83249°N 1.12749°W	—	Early 18th century	A house and stable in red brick, with a floor band, and a pantile roof with raised coped gables and kneelers. There are two storeys and three bays, and a single-storey stable wing to the right. The doorway has a fanlight, the windows are sashes, most of them horizontally-sliding, and in the stable wing are two doorways and a casement window.	II
Ouse View and Rose Dene; 53.83351°N 1.12207°W	—	1735	A house, later divided into two, in pinkish-brown brick, with a floor band, cogged eaves, and a pantile roof with coped gables and kneelers. There are two storeys and an attic, and three bays, with the gable end facing the street. Steps lead to the central doorway that has a fanlight, the windows are a mix of sashes and casements, and all the openings have blocked elliptical arches.	II
5 Wistow Gate; 53.83030°N 1.12524°W		Early to mid 18th century	The house is in brown brick on a moulded plinth, with a floor band, a moulded modillion cornice, and a pantile roof with brick coped gables and kneelers. There are two storeys and four bays. The doorway has a rubbed brick arch and a segmental moulded brick pediment. In the ground floor are a fixed window and two sashes, above the door is a small window, and the other windows in the upper floor are casements.	II
Goole Bank Farmhouse; 53.83409°N 1.11941°W		Early to mid 18th century	The farmhouse is in reddish-orange brick on a moulded plinth, with a dentilled eaves cornice, a roof of tile on the front and pantile at the rear, and a Dutch gable on the right. There are two storeys and six bays. The doorway has a fanlight, and the windows are sashes, those in the ground floor with moulded segmental pediments. At the rear is a two-storey stair turret.	II
Rose Cottage; 53.83366°N 1.12069°W	—	Early to mid 18th century	A house in red brick on a magnesian limestone plinth with brick capping, rendered at the rear, with a moulded floor band, and a pantile roof with stone coping. There are two storeys and two bays. In the front is a blocked entrance with an elliptical head, and the doorway is in the right return. The windows are 20th-century replacements.	II
Goole Bank Farm Barn; 53.83413°N 1.11908°W		1737	A stable and hayloft, later a barn, in red brick, with a floor band, cogged eaves, and a swept pantile roof with tumbled-in brickwork on the gable ends. There are two storeys, and it contains a round-arched entrance, a blocked entrance, three elliptical-arched windows in the ground floor, and a fixed light window in the upper floor. In the north gable are pitching doors, and there are the remains of tile pigeon nesting boxes in the south gable.	II
8 Market Place; 53.83284°N 1.13016°W	—	Mid 18th century	A house and a shop, in brown brick, the front rendered and whitewashed, with magnesian limestone dressings, and a pantile roof with a stone coped gable and kneelers on the right. There are two storeys and three bays. The right two bays contain a shopfront that has a central doorway with a fanlight, and flanking plate glass windows with pilasters and a fascia and a cornice on consoles. To the left is a 20th-century window, and the upper floor contains sash windows.	II
22 and 24 Church End; 53.83288°N 1.12394°W	—	Mid 18th century	A pair of houses in brown brick, with an eaves band and a pantile roof. There are two storeys and four bays. The entrances are in the right return and at the rear, and on the front are sash windows, some horizontally-sliding.	II
Pigeoncote, The Grange; 53.83055°N 1.12551°W	—	Mid 18th century	The pigeoncote is in red brick, with a floor band, and a pantile roof with brick coping. In the ground floor is a doorway, and there are elliptical-headed openings in both floors, those in the ground floor blocked. Inside, there are nesting boxes in the upper floor.	II
The Laurels; 53.83244°N 1.12737°W	—	18th century	A school and school house, later a private house, it is roughcast and colourwashed, and has a hipped pantile roof. The former house has two storeys, the schoolroom has one storey, both at the same height, and each part has two bays. On the front is a projecting porch with a capped parapet containing a doorway with an oblong fanlight. To its left is a casement window in each floor, and the other windows are sashes.	II
2 Market Place; 53.83300°N 1.12976°W		1751	A house and a shop on a corner site, the shop older, and the house added to the left in the 19th century. The building is in brown brick with stone dressings, a floor band, a dentilled eaves cornice and a pantile roof. There are two storeys, each part has two bays, and there is a single-storey outshut on the left. On the corner is a wooden shopfront, with pilasters, a cornice on consoles, and an entrance in the angle on the corner. In the upper floor are sash windows with cambered arches, and an initialled datestone. The house to the left has a doorway with pilasters, a fanlight, a cornice and a hood, and the windows are sashes with flat brick arches.	II
Compton Court Hotel; 53.83351°N 1.13012°W	—	Late 18th century	A house, later a hotel, in brown mottled brick, with stone dressings, wooden eaves, and a hipped slate roof. There are two storeys, three bays, flanking single-storey wings, and a rear outshut. The central doorway has engaged Doric columns, an entablature, a radial fanlight, and an open dentilled pediment. The windows are sashes with wedge lintels. The wings have parapets and end piers with caps and urn finials.	II
Mill House; 53.83238°N 1.12637°W	—	Late 18th century	The house is in reddish-brown brick, and has a pantile roof. There are two storeys and three bays. Steps lead up to the central doorway that has pilasters, a fanlight, and a cornice on consoles. The windows are sashes in architraves under cambered arches.	II
The Moorings; 53.83238°N 1.12653°W	—	Late 18th to early 19th century	A house in brown brick, with stone dressings, wooden eaves and a slate roof. There are two storeys and three bays. Four steps lead to a doorway with fluted Ionic pilasters, a decorated radial fanlight, and a cornice on acanthus consoles. The windows are sashes, those in the outer bays tripartite, all with wedge lintels.	II
Mill Bank; 53.83232°N 1.12598°W	—	Second quarter of the 19th century	The house is in painted brick with stone dressings, a wooden eaves band, and a slate roof. There are two storeys and five bays. The doorway has pilasters, a rectangular reactangular fanlight and a modillion cornice. The windows are sashes with channelled wedge lintels.	II
62–72 Church End; 53.83373°N 1.12050°W	—	1839	A group of almshouses in brown brick with stone dressings and a slate roof. There is a single storey and six bays. The centre is pedimented with an inscribed plaque, and a gabled porch; both have stone coping and a ball finial. The doorways have Tudor arches, and the windows have two lights, mullions and diamond glazing. All the openings have hood moulds.	II
Cawood Bridge; 53.83374°N 1.12818°W		1872	A swing bridge carrying the B1222 road over the River Ouse, it is in iron, and consists of five bays of segmental-arched girders with lattice work and railings. The middle span is the largest, and it revolves on a large disc supported by eight columns. The central piers have timber cutwaters, and on the bridge are iron lamps on wooden buttressing.	II
Telephone kiosk 53.83026°N 1.12557°W		1935	The K6 type telephone kiosk in Wistowgate was designed by Giles Gilbert Scott. Constructed in cast iron with a square plan and a dome, it has three unperforated crowns in the top panels.	II
