= Old Palace, York =

Grade I listed building in York, England

Old Palace
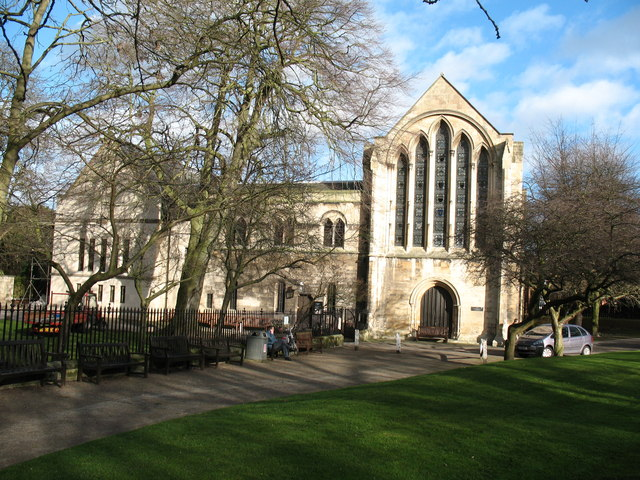
- York Minster Library

- Location within York Central
- Alternative names: Minster Library

General information
- Location: Dean's Park, York, England
- Coordinates: 53.9635°N 1.0824°W
- Year built: 1230s
- Renovated: 1806–1813 (restored)

Renovating team
- Architect: William Shout

Listed Building – Grade I
- Official name: Old Palace, York
- Designated: 14 June 1954
- Reference no.: 1257880

The Old Palace, in the city of York, North Yorkshire, England, is also known as the Minster Library and stands in Dean's Park. It houses York Minster's library and archives, as well as the Collections Department and conservation studio. Its modern name refers to the part of the building that was formerly the chapel of the Archbishop of York, built in the 13th century.

== History ==
On 29 March 1628, the Archbishop of York Tobias Matthew died and he left his fortune not to his sons or the church but to his wife Frances Matthew. Amongst his possessions was a large collections of books that were said to be the "largest private collection in England". There were 600 books and they were valued then at £300 and Frances decided to give all of these to York Minster. These books are the basis of the library and it was said that her gift deserved 'to live as long as the church itself'. Frances had been married for fifty years and she died the year after making the gift.

This building was refurbished by William Shout between 1806 and 1813, and shortly thereafter became the home of the Minster library. Notable items held in the collection include cathedral records dating to back to 1150 and a copy of the 1631 Wicked Bible. It is a Grade I listed building. An extension was added in 1998.

== See also ==
- Grade I listed buildings in the City of York
- Listed buildings in York (within the city walls, northern part)
