= Cawood =

Village and civil parish in North Yorkshire, England

Coordinates: 53°49′54″N 1°07′44″W

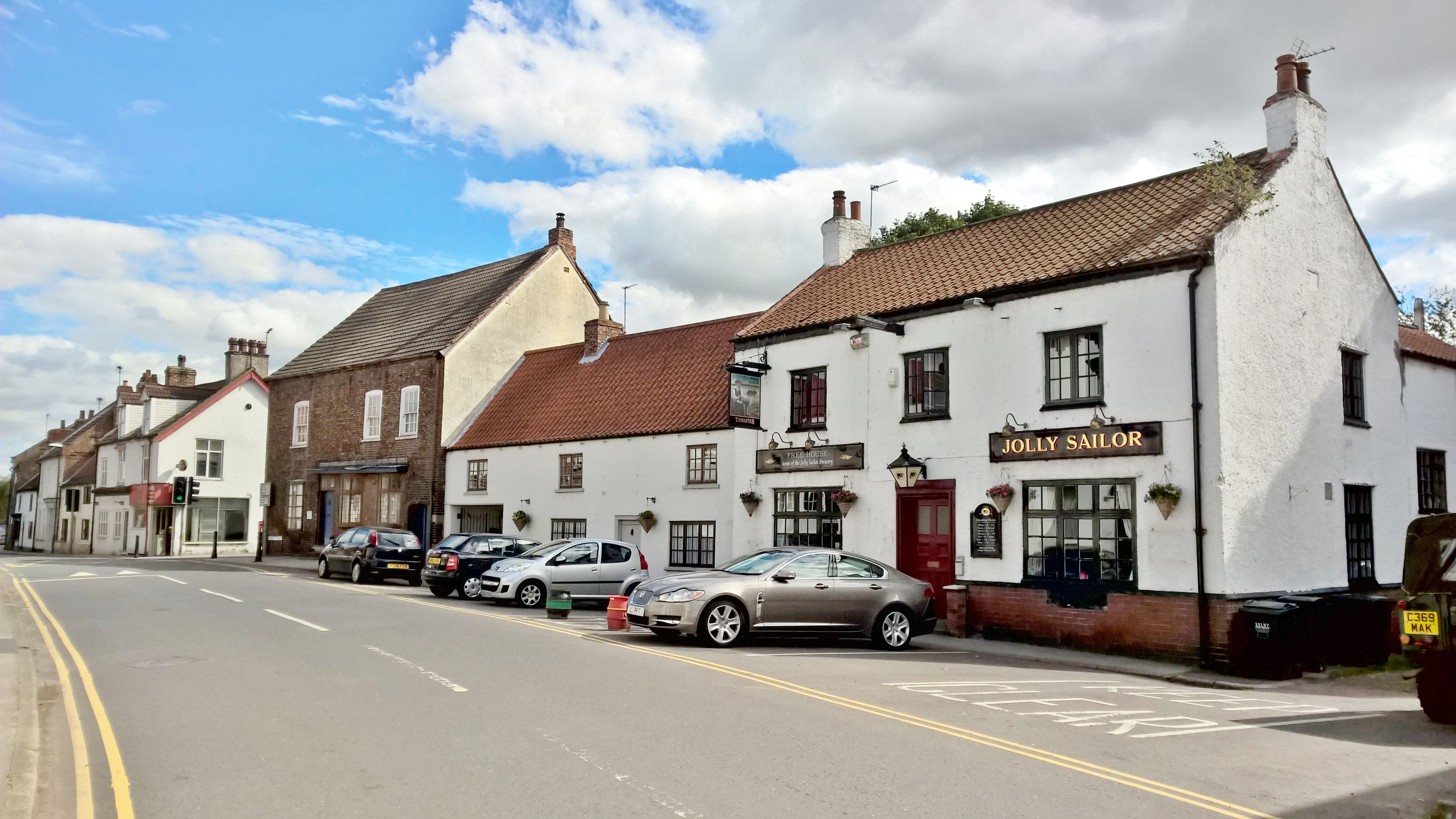
- Centre of Cawood

- Location within North Yorkshire
- Population: 1,655 (2021 Census)
- OS grid reference: SE572377
- Unitary authority: North Yorkshire
- Ceremonial county: North Yorkshire
- Region: Yorkshire and the Humber
- Country: England
- Sovereign state: United Kingdom
- Post town: SELBY
- Postcode district: YO8
- Police: North Yorkshire
- Fire: North Yorkshire
- Ambulance: Yorkshire
- UK Parliament: Selby

Cawood (other names: Carwood) is a village and civil parish in North Yorkshire, England that is notable as the location of the Cawood sword.

Historically part of the West Riding of Yorkshire, Cawood belonged to the Liberty of Cawood, Wistow and Otley. From 1974 to 2023 it was within the district of Selby. Since 1 April 2023 it has been administered by North Yorkshire Council. For elections to the UK Parliament the village is in the Selby constituency, created for the 2024 general election.

== Etymology ==
The name Cawood is first attested in a fourteenth-century copy of a charter of 963, as Kawuda and in an eleventh-century copy of a charter of between 972 and 992, as Cawuda. Modern scholarship has concluded that the name comes from the Old English words cā ("jackdaw") and wudu ("wood"); thus it once meant "jackdaw woods".

== History ==
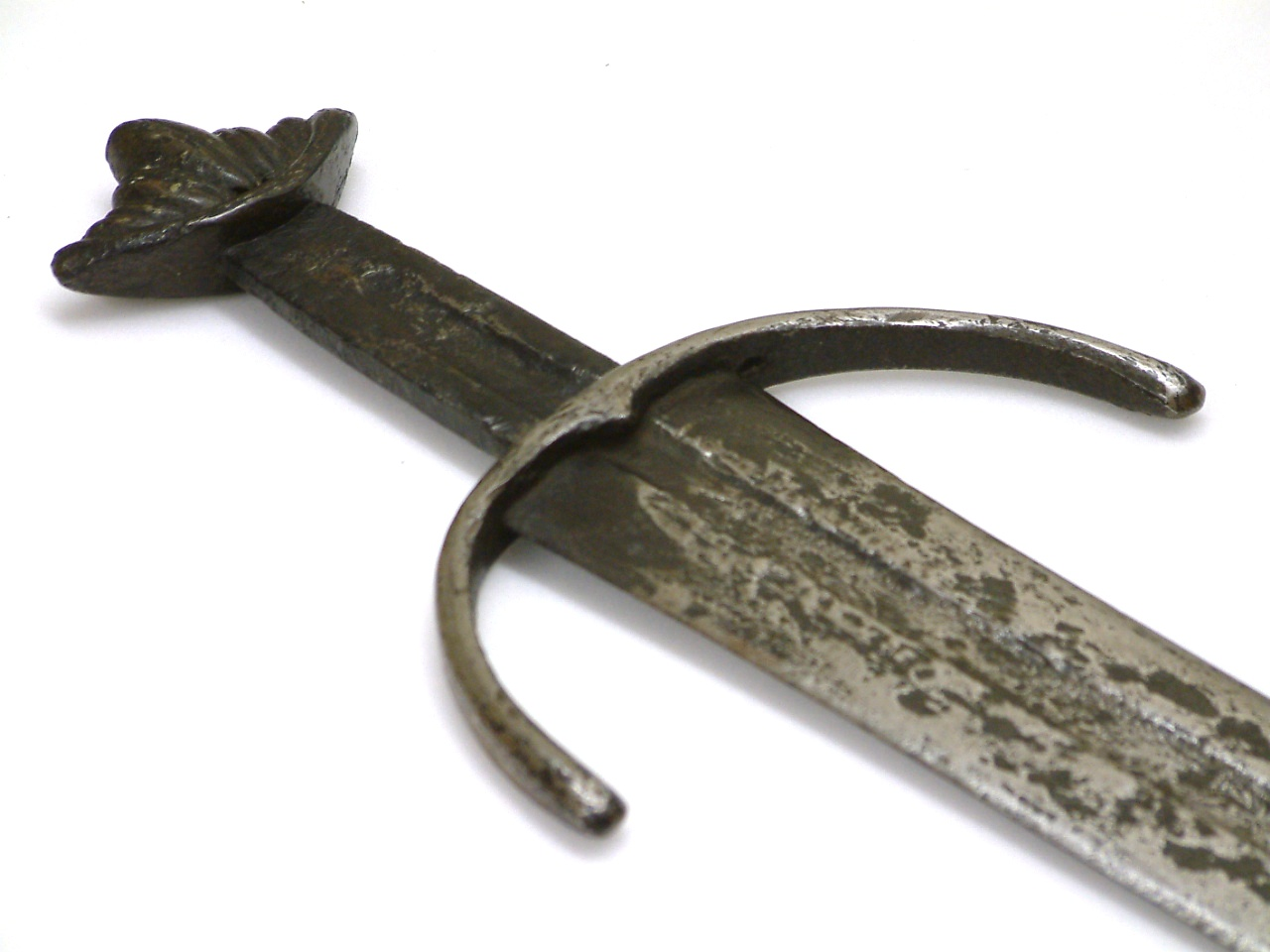
Cawood Sword

In his King's England series, Arthur Mee refers to Cawood as "the Windsor of the North". Cawood was formerly one of the chief places of residence of the Archbishop of York, who had here a magnificent Palace or Castle, in which several of the bishops died. It was obtained for the see of York from King Athelstan, in the 10th century, by Archbishop Wulfstan. The village surrounded its walls. Alexander Nevil, the 45th Archbishop, is said to have bestowed great cost on this palace, and to have adorned it with several new towers. Henry Bowett, the 49th Archbishop, built the great hall; and his successor, Cardinal Kemp, erected the gatehouse, the ruins of which are all that remain of this once magnificent building.

During the Civil War the castle changed hands. Royalists retook it before Lord Fairfax captured Cawood in the spring of 1644.

In the 1800s Cawood was considered a market and parish-town, "in the wapentake of Barkston-Ash, liberties of St. Peter and Cawood, Wistow, and Otley; 5 miles from Selby, 7½ from Tadcaster, 10 from York, 12 from Pontefract, 186 from London." Cawood being within the Liberty of Cawood, Wistow, and Otley made the village administratively independent from the surrounding West Riding of Yorkshire. In 1864 the Liberty was brought within the jurisdiction of the West Riding following the mechanism provided by the Liberties Act, ending separate quarter sessions. Market was Wednesday, with fairs held on Old May day and on 23 September, and the principal inn was the Ferry House.

The local church, a peculiar, was a vicarage, dedicated to All Saints, in the deanery of Ainsty (now New Ainsty). Some of the economic changes in the following decades were also due to increased transportation and agricultural mechanization. It remained part of the West Riding of Yorkshire until 1974.

Cawood is south of the point where the River Wharfe flows into the River Ouse which subsequently forms the northern border of the village. Cawood Bridge is the village's only crossing of the Ouse and opened on 31 July 1872, replacing a long-standing ferry service. Dick Turpin is said to have forded the river when he escaped to York, which lies about ten miles north. The River Ouse used to flood the village regularly in winter. Since the floods of January 1982, whose height is marked on the bridgekeeper's cottage, river defences have been raised so that the fields on the northern side (Kelfield Ings) and the former Ferry Boat Inn, also on the Kelfield side, are now the only areas that flood, even at times of exceptionally high waters, such as in November 2000.

== Governance ==
Cawood is a civil parish with a parish council. The village is administered by North Yorkshire Council, which became the unitary authority for the area on 1 April 2023 when the former district councils, including Selby District, were abolished under The North Yorkshire (Structural Changes) Order 2022. For local government elections Cawood lies in the Cawood & Escrick electoral division of North Yorkshire Council.

For elections to the UK Parliament the parish is in the Selby constituency, first contested at the 2024 general election. From 2010 to 2024 it was in Selby and Ainsty.

Since 2024 Cawood has formed part of the York and North Yorkshire Combined Authority, a mayoral combined authority created by statutory instrument and launched on 1 February 2024.

Historically, the parish belonged to the Liberty of Cawood, Wistow and Otley, a jurisdiction of the Archbishop of York with its own quarter sessions.

== Geography ==
Cawood is located about 1 kilometre downstream from where the Ouse meets the River Wharfe. The village marks a historic river crossing point that is currently traversed by Cawood Bridge, a Grade II listed iron swing bridge that opened on 31 July 1872 on the B1222 route.

The medieval Bishop Dyke, now a land drain, was originally a navigable canal linking Sherburn in Elmet to the River Ouse. Cawood had a staith that remained in use until the nineteenth century.

The village is surrounded by washlands and low-lying farmland. North of the village, the Ings act as flood storage for the Ouse. During the November 2000 floods, the Environment Agency carried out emergency works at Cawood to prevent the river from breaching its banks. The local gauge station continues to track water levels, recording thresholds that, when crossed, have historically meant flooding for roads and properties nearby.

Climate data for Cawood (1991–2020)
Month	Jan	Feb	Mar	Apr	May	Jun	Jul	Aug	Sep	Oct	Nov	Dec	Year
Mean daily maximum °C (°F)	7.4 (45.3)	7.5 (45.5)	9.4 (48.9)	13.2 (55.8)	16.4 (61.5)	19.6 (67.3)	22.0 (71.6)	21.0 (69.8)	18.1 (64.6)	14.6 (58.3)	10.2 (50.4)	8.9 (48.0)	13.9 (57.0)
Daily mean °C (°F)	4.6 (40.3)	4.4 (39.9)	5.7 (42.3)	8.6 (47.5)	11.7 (53.1)	14.7 (58.5)	16.7 (62.1)	16.3 (61.3)	13.8 (56.8)	11.1 (52.0)	7.1 (44.8)	5.9 (42.6)	10.0 (50.0)
Mean daily minimum °C (°F)	1.7 (35.1)	1.4 (34.5)	2.1 (35.8)	3.9 (39.0)	7.0 (44.6)	9.7 (49.5)	11.5 (52.7)	11.5 (52.7)	9.6 (49.3)	7.8 (46.0)	3.8 (38.8)	2.6 (36.7)	6.1 (43.0)
Average precipitation mm (inches)	55.5 (2.19)	30.8 (1.21)	59.6 (2.35)	34.1 (1.34)	55.8 (2.20)	40.1 (1.58)	51.2 (2.02)	71.1 (2.80)	46.3 (1.82)	51.2 (2.02)	67.3 (2.65)	47.9 (1.89)	610.9 (24.05)
Average precipitation days (≥ 1.0 mm)	13.3	8.2	10.3	7.0	9.5	7.3	7.7	10.0	8.3	10.5	10.5	10.5	113.2
Source: Meteo Climat

== Demographics ==
The civil parish had 1,429 residents at the 2001 census, 1,549 at the 2011 census and 1,655 at the 2021 census. The built-up area of Cawood, which covers a smaller footprint than the civil parish, recorded 1,502 residents at the 2021 census.

== Economy and amenities ==
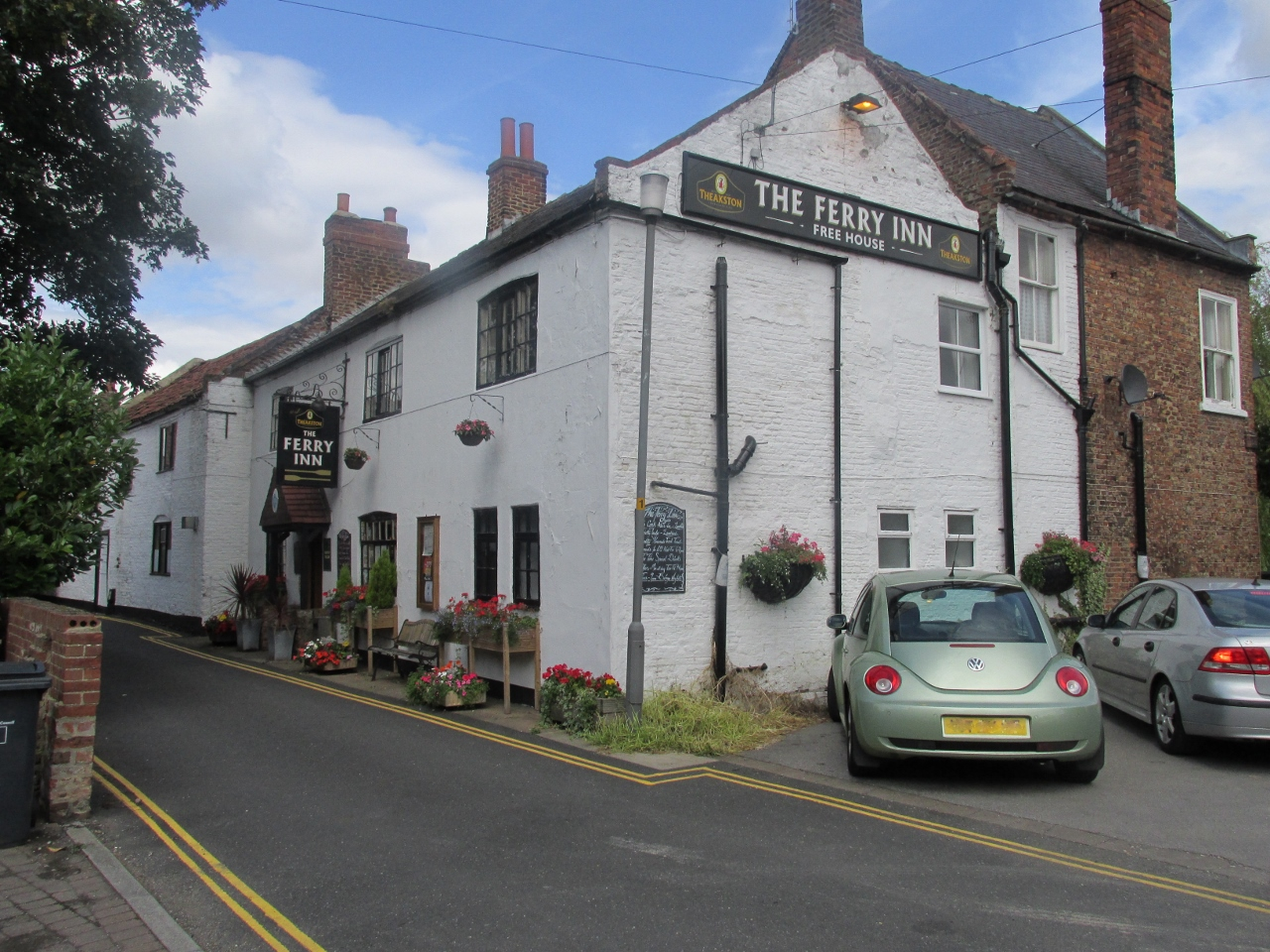
The Ferry Inn Pub

Cawood has a small range of local services and community facilities centred on land managed by the parish council, including the Castle Garth open space, the playing fields and the cemetery. The playing fields host village football, cricket, bowls and tennis clubs and include a children’s play area and other amenities.

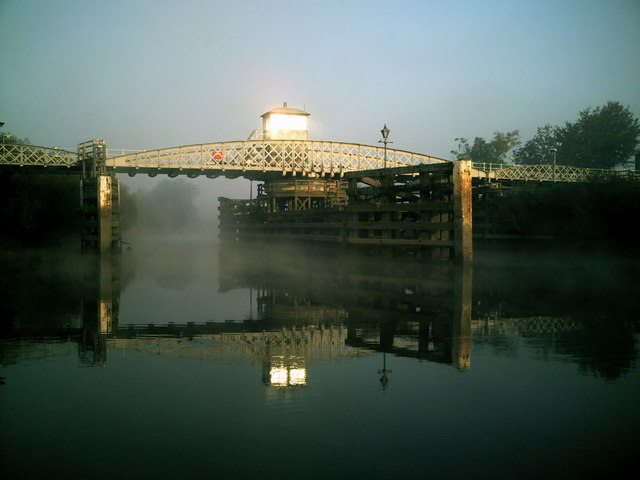
Cawood swing-bridge, crossing over the River Ouse

The gatehouse of Cawood Castle is operated as holiday accommodation by the Landmark Trust, bringing visitors to the village. The village has several public houses, including the Ferry Inn near Cawood Bridge, the Jolly Sailor on the Market Place and the Castle Inn on Wistowgate.

== Landmarks ==
=== Cawood Castle ===
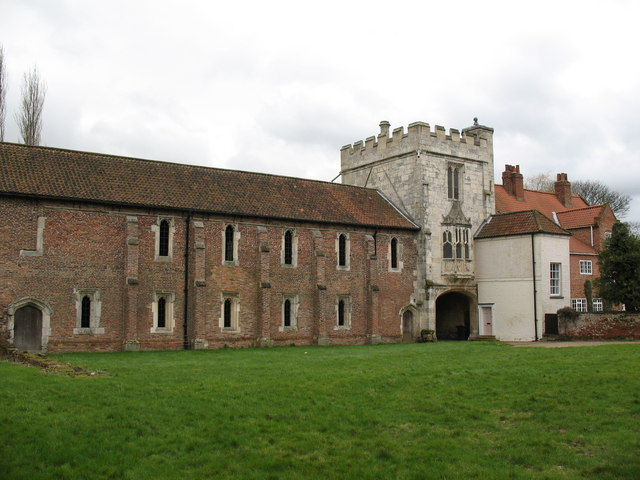
Cawood Castle

Cawood Castle is at the centre of the village and was a residence of the Archbishops of York until the English Reformation. The remaining buildings are a three-storey stone gatehouse built for Archbishop Kemp in the mid 15th century and the adjoining two-storey banqueting hall. Both structures are Grade I listed.

Following the English Civil War the palace was largely demolished, the remains together with the Castle Garth are designated as a scheduled monument. The scheduled monument includes the palace gardens with five fishponds and a quarry pit, and retains well-preserved below-ground structures from the medieval complex.

The gatehouse is owned by the Landmark Trust, which acquired it in 1985, restored the building and lets it as holiday accommodation. The Trust has carried out repairs to the adjoining banqueting hall, it is kept secure and roofed but remains unused.

The Castle Garth open space is owned by Cawood Parish Council and managed as public open land. Within it, a rectangular inner enclosure of about 1.6 hectares, formerly moated on at least three sides, preserves the plan of an early garden that is probably seventeenth-century or earlier.

=== Cawood Bridge ===
The B1222 crosses the River Ouse on the Cawood Bridge, a swing bridge made of wrought iron. It is listed at Grade II and opened on 31 July 1872.

Plaques on the bridge record the opening on 31 July 1872 and name Robert Hodgson as engineer, with T. B. Nelson and John Butler as contractors.

=== All Saints' Church ===
Cawood's parish church is called All Saints' Church. All Saints' was first listed at Grade I on 17 November 1966. The south porch was rebuilt in 1935, and inside is a life-size demi-figure monument to Archbishop George Montaigne, who died in 1623.

=== Kensbury or Keesbury moated site ===
A separate scheduled monument within the parish preserves the moated site known as Kensbury or Keesbury Hall, identified as the seat of the de Cawood family. The monument includes the moated island, an associated fishpond and fragments of medieval ridge-and-furrow.

== Transport ==
Cawood lies on the B1222, which crosses the River Ouse at Cawood Bridge. Construction of the swing bridge to replace the ferry was authorised by a local Act in 1870, and the bridge opened on 31 July 1872.

Arriva Yorkshire operates a regular bus service between Selby, the village and York via route 42.

When the Cawood, Wistow and Selby Light Railway first opened in 1898, Cawood served as its terminus. On 1 January 1930, passenger services were discontinued, however, a goods service persisted until 1960. The Selby to Cawood branch hosted the North Eastern Railway's pioneering petrol-electric "autocar" in the early 1900s, when one of the experimental units was transferred to work services on the line.

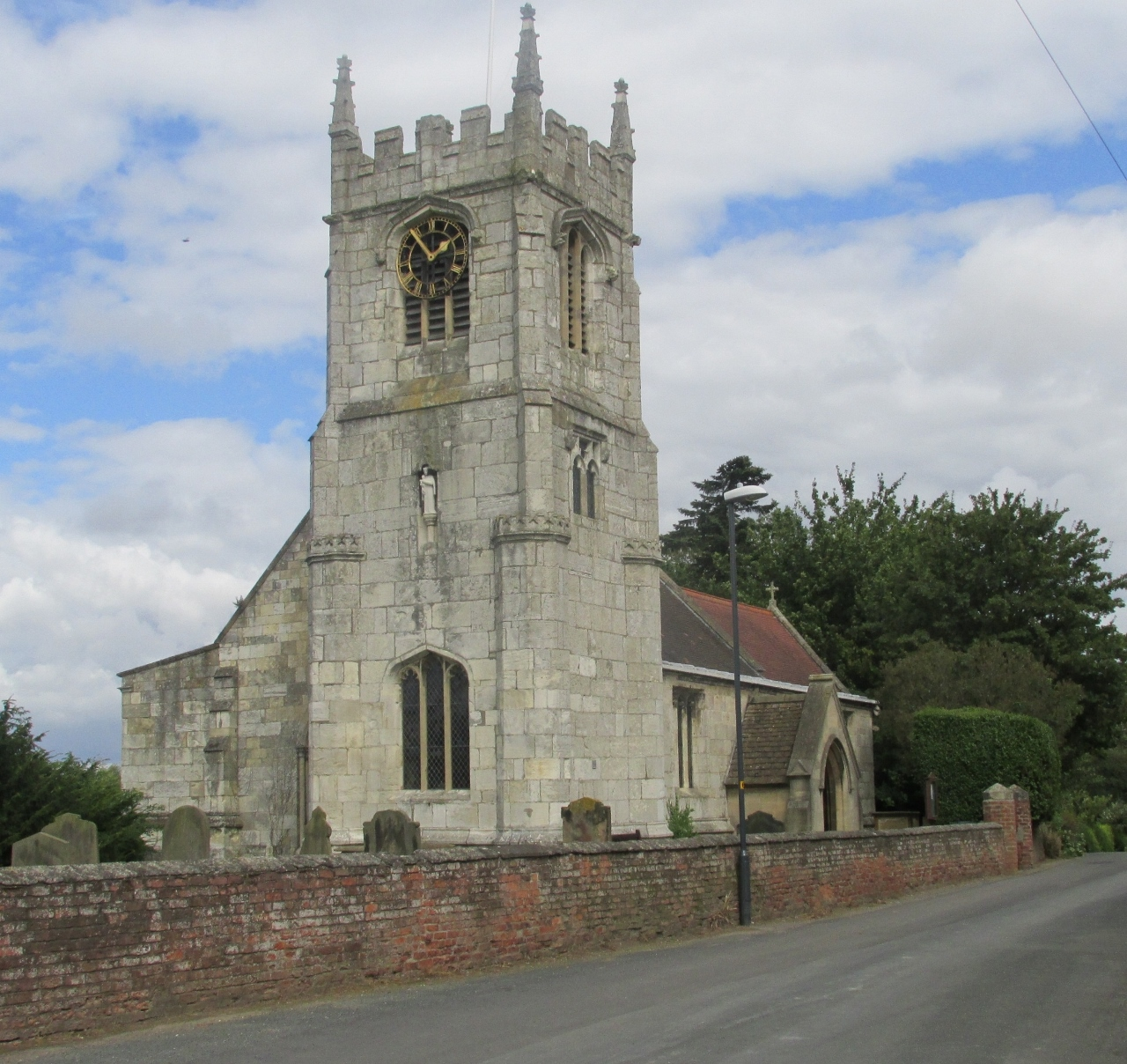
The church in 2014

== Religion ==
The village is served by a parish church, dedicated to All Saints. It is a Grade I listed building.

== Education ==
The village is served by Cawood Church of England (Voluntary Controlled) Primary School.

== Notable people ==
- Walter Giffard (c. 1225–1279), Archbishop of York, obtained a royal licence to crenellate the manor at Cawood in 1272.
- William Greenfield (died 1315), Archbishop of York, died in Cawood.
- William Melton (died 1340), Archbishop of York, died in Cawood.
- William de la Zouche (1299–1352), Archbishop of York, died in Cawood.
- Henry Bowet (died 1423), Archbishop of York, rebuilt the great hall at Cawood.
- John Kempe (c. 1380–1454), Archbishop of York, builder of the surviving gatehouse at Cawood Castle.
- Alexander Neville (c. 1332–1392), Archbishop of York, oversaw building works at Cawood in the later fourteenth century.
- Thomas Rotherham (1423–1500), Archbishop of York, died in Cawood.
- George Neville (1432–1476), Archbishop of York, marked his installation with a feast in Cawood in 1465.
- Thomas Savage (1449–1507), Archbishop of York, died in Cawood.
- Thomas Wolsey (1470–1530), cardinal and statesman, arrested at Cawood Castle in November 1530.
- Henry Percy, 6th Earl of Northumberland (1502–1537), nobleman who arrested Wolsey at Cawood on the king's orders.
- Tobias Matthew (1546–1628), Archbishop of York, died in Cawood.
- George Montaigne (1569–1628), Archbishop of York, born in Cawood and buried at All Saints' Church, Cawood.
- Henry Monson (1793–1866), founding settler of Dunedin, New Zealand, and its first full-time gaoler.
- Claude Anson (1889–1969), Yorkshire cricketer, died in Cawood in 1969.
- Michael Lyons (1943–2019), sculptor, lived at Cawood in later life and died there, Vice-President of the Royal British Society of Sculptors, 1994 to 1997.

== See also ==
- Bishopthorpe Palace
- Grade I listed buildings in North Yorkshire
- Listed buildings in Cawood
- Selby District
- Vale of York
