= Henry Monson (gaoler) =

Gaoler (1793–1866)

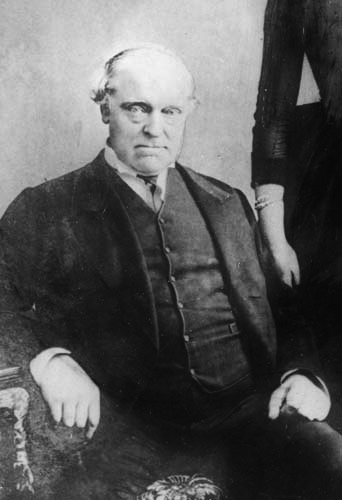
- Born: 25 August 1793; Cawood, West Riding of Yorkshire, England
- Died: 9 December 1866 (aged 73); Otago region, New Zealand
- Occupation: Gaoler

Henry Monson (25 August 1793 – 9 December 1866) was a founding settler in Dunedin, New Zealand. His journal, recording his career as Dunedin's first full-time gaoler, forms an historical document on social conditions in New Zealand in the 1850s.

== Biography ==
Henry Monson was born on 25 August 1793 in Cawood, West Riding of Yorkshire, England, the son of Bernard Monson, a labourer. By 1825 he was living in London, where he married and set up in business as a builder and carpenter, only to go bankrupt in 1826. A devoted Methodist, he worked to help London's slum children as the superintendent of a Ragged school. In 1847 he again went bankrupt and turned to a neighbour, the computer pioneer Charles Babbage, for help in obtaining assisted passage to New Zealand. He duly sailed on the John Wickliffe along with two of his sons, William Henry and John Robert, arriving at Port Chalmers on 23 March 1848.

During Monson's first three years in Dunedin his struggle to survive as a builder and carpenter became increasingly difficult, and was brought to a head by the burning down of his own painfully built house. The crisis was resolved in 1851 when, through Charles Babbage's continuing influence, he was appointed to keep Dunedin's newly established gaol. He took up his duties on 1 September 1851, and at the same time began to keep the journal which has secured him his small niche in New Zealand history. Monson's administration was informed by his Christian principles, which led him to lead prayer meetings, teach some of his prisoners reading and writing, and (most unusually at the time) abstain from the use of flogging. He set out his philosophy in an official report:

The punishment of vengeance or anything else which is calculated to embitter the life of a Prisoner, beyond that of Barrs and Fence, I most strenuously condemn…A Criminal of any "Class" cannot be improved by any mode of severity; he may, and generally will be, by an enlightened spirit of humanity.

This liberal policy, which was continuously opposed by his immediate superiors in the Provincial government, was found by a delegation of Visiting Judges in 1855 to produce encouraging results:

Mr. Monson the Gaoler appears to have stood nearly alone in all efforts hitherto to improve the moral status of the prisoners…It is but just a tribute of praise to say that he has evinced great zeal, and that his system of "moral suasion" coupled with firmness appears to have succeeded where, perhaps, under the circumstances, no other would.

Henry Monson retired from his post on 15 November 1861. Five years later, on 9 December 1866, he died at a friend's house in Maungatua, Otago Region. He was 73.
