= Easton, Hampshire =

Village and parish in Hampshire, England

Coordinates: 51.085758°N 1.270100°W

Easton
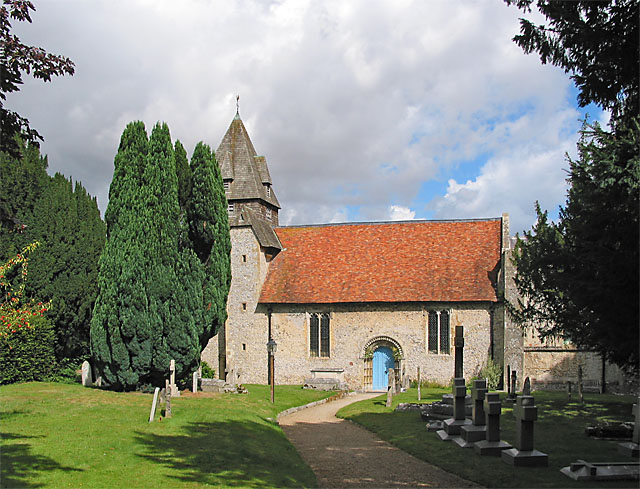
- St Mary's church, Easton

- Location within Hampshire
- OS grid reference: SU511321
- Civil parish: Itchen Valley
- District: City of Winchester
- Shire county: Hampshire
- Region: South East
- Country: England
- Sovereign state: United Kingdom
- Post town: WINCHESTER
- Postcode district: SO21
- Dialling code: 01962
- Police: Hampshire and Isle of Wight
- Fire: Hampshire and Isle of Wight
- Ambulance: South Central
- UK Parliament: Winchester

Easton is a village and former civil parish, now in the parish of Itchen Valley, in the Winchester district, in the county of Hampshire, England, situated on the River Itchen, 2¾ miles north east of Winchester. In 1931 the parish had a population of 408. On 1 April 1932 the parish was abolished to form Itchen Valley.

In 1870–72, John Goring's Imperial Gazetteer of England and Wales described Easton like this:

"EASTON, a village and a parish in Winchester district, Hants. The village stands on the river Itchen, near the Southwestern railway, 2¾ miles NE by N of Winchester; is small and uninteresting; and has a post office under Winchester. The parish comprises 2,734 acres [11 km²]. Real property, £3, 656. Pop., 455. Houses, 106. The property is much subdivided. The living is a rectory in the diocese of Winchester. Value, £514.* Patron, the Bishop of Winchester. The church is late Norman; has a rich south doorway, and an apsidal vaulted chancel; contains a monument to Bishop Barlow's widow, recording that her five daughters were all married to bishops; and was restored in 1850. There is a Wesleyan chapel."

In 2010 Easton remains a small village but underwent limited development during the inter and post-war period. The population has grown by about 300 since John Goring's time. Around ten additional houses have been built since 2000, and the land price has rocketed, although planning restrictions are very strict. The church mentioned in the above passage still stands and operates. There are two pubs in the village (The Chestnut Horse and The Cricketers Inn, the former of which having been acquired by Avington Park after a period of disrepair and set to reopen in late 2023), a small auto-garage and a village hall. The hall performs various functions including crèche services, WI meetings, a pavilion for the village cricket team and is the venue for an annual pantomime. The hall has just been rebuilt, after a 5-year fund-raising drive by villagers.

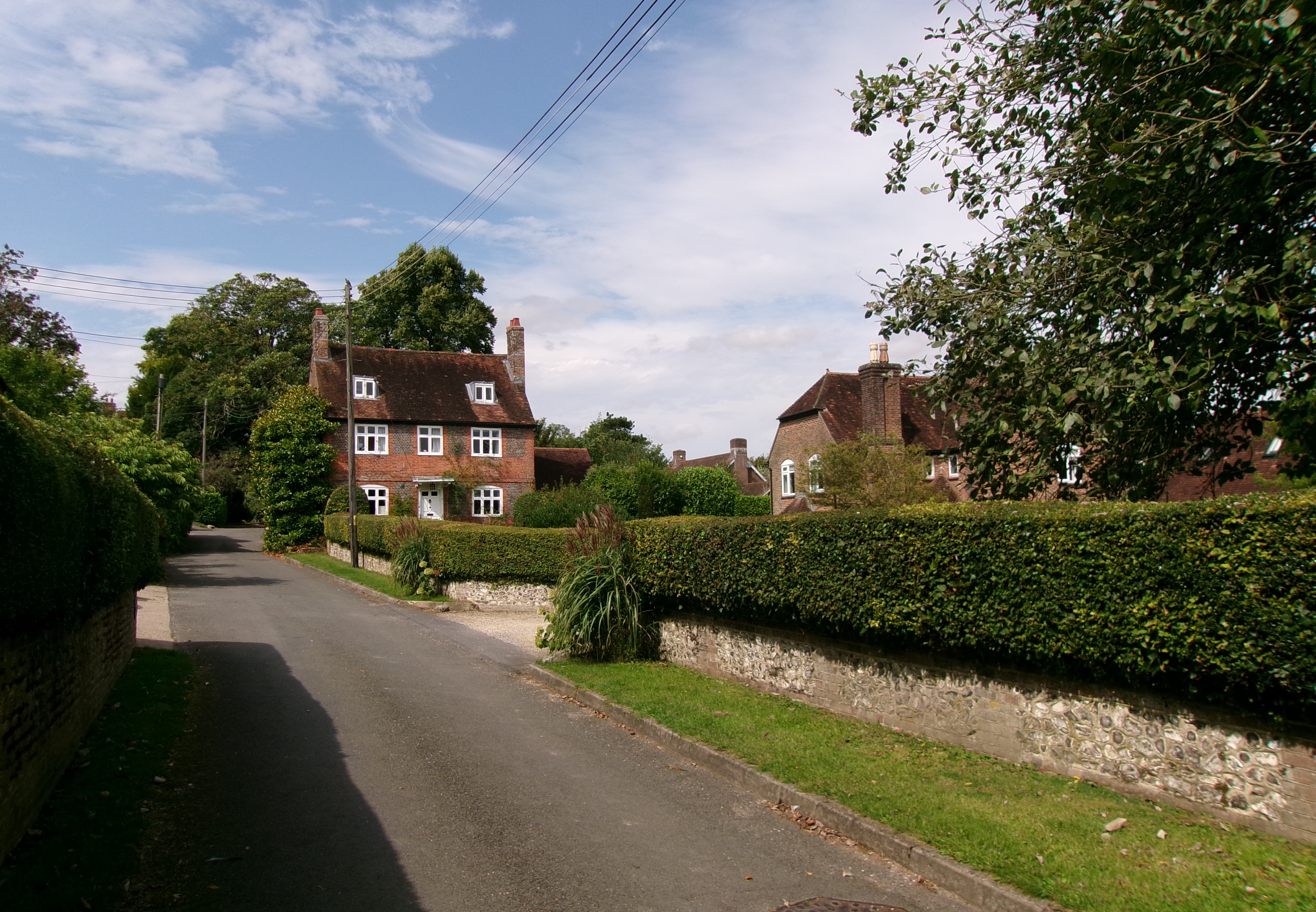
Church Lane

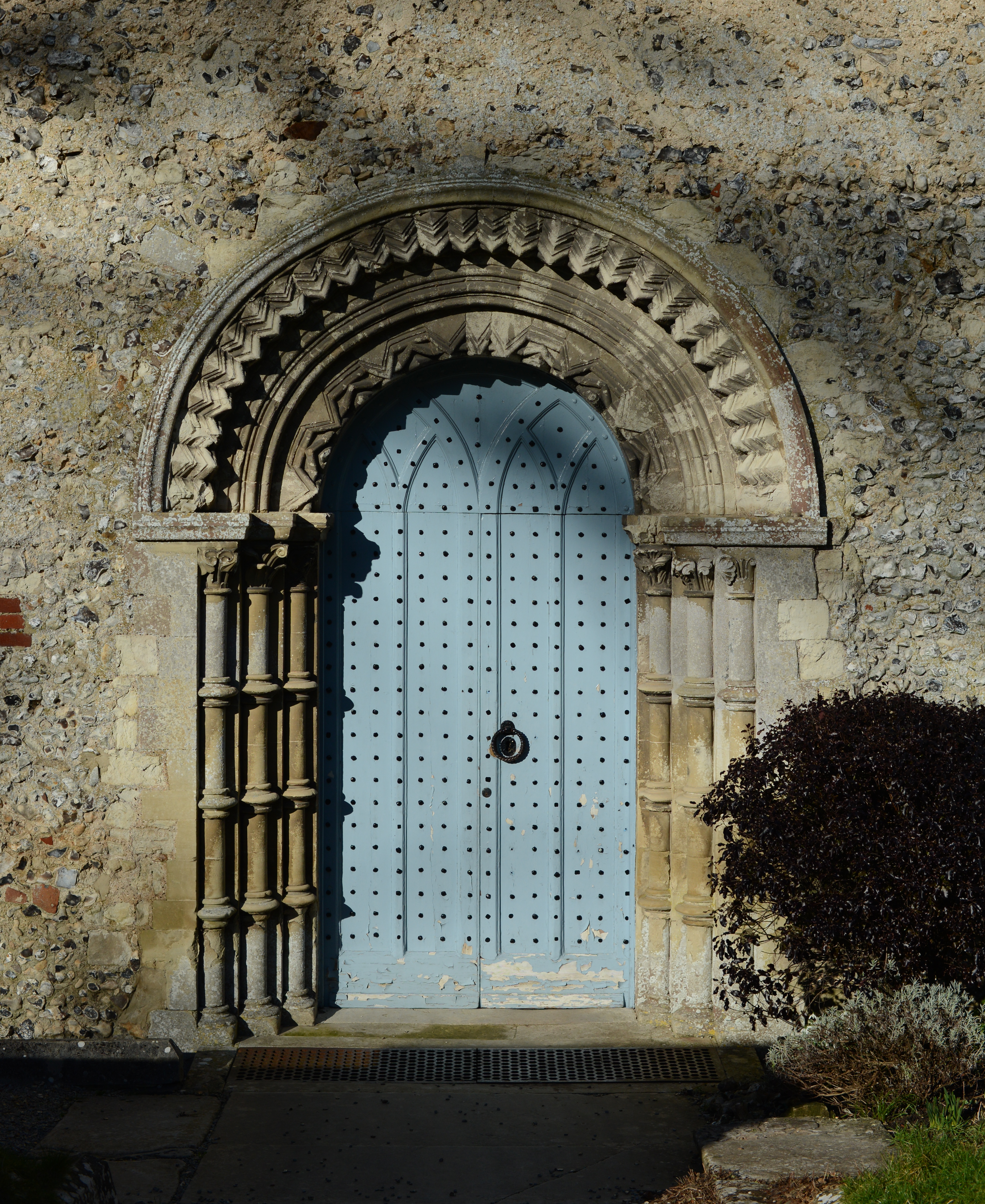
South Door, Church of St. Mary, Easton.
