= Joseph Webbe =

Joseph Webbe (fl. 1610 – 1630) was an English grammarian, physician, and astrologer. He is now remembered for his views on language teaching, which were based on minimal instruction in grammar, against the contemporary fashion.

== Life ==
A Catholic, he graduated M.D. and Ph.D., perhaps at Padua. Before 1622 he returned to England, and in 1623 was residing in the Old Bailey; John Gee, in his Foot out of the Snare, describes him as there and taking pupils. Through Samuel Hartlib Webbe corresponded in 1629 with another innovator, William Brookes.

== Works ==
In 1612 he published at Rome an astrological work entitled Minae Coalestes Affectus segrotantibus denunciantes, hoc anno 1612.

He strongly advocated a colloquial method of teaching languages, proposing to extend it even to the classical tongues, and to substitute it for the manner of grammatical study in general use. He was influenced in this by Georgius Haloinus and Wolfgang Ratke. In 1622 he published, in support of his views, An Appeale to Truth, in the Controuersie betweene Art and Vse (London), which he supplemented in 1623 by A Petition to the High Court of Parliament, in the behalf of auncient and authentique Authors (London), in which he says that his system has received encouragement from James I, and that he wishes to receive a monopoly of the right to teach by his method. The Pueriles confabulatiunculae, or children talke, claused and drawne into lessons appeared in 1627.

A work dedicated to Charles I from 1626, entitled Vsus et Authoritas (London), was a treatise on hexameters and pentameters. Webbe was also the author of translations, including one of The Familiar Epistles of Cicero (London), undated, but probably published about 1620. In 1629 bilingual versions of Andria and Eunuchus, the plays of Terence, were set out in columns by phrase.
