= Bath Place, London =

House in London, England

Bath Place was a prominent London residence that had belonged to the Bishops of Bath. It was in the parish of "St Clement without Temple Bar" near Temple Bar and relatively close to the King's residence

On 27 June 1539, it was 'assured in Parliament to William Fitzwilliam, Earl of Southampton, who was living there in April of that year. After that, it was known for a time as Hampton Place'. In return an Act of Parliament forced the Earl to give the Bishop the Minories as his palace. Bath Place was owned by the Earl until his death in 1543.
