= Nicholas Hill (scientist) =

English natural philosopher (1570 – c. 1610)

Nicholas Hill (1570 – c. 1610) was an English natural philosopher, considered a disciple of Giordano Bruno. He is known for his 1601 book Philosophia epicurea.

== Life ==
He was educated at Merchant Taylors' School and St John's College, Oxford where he matriculated in 1587, graduated B.A. and became Fellow in 1590. He was removed from his fellowship in 1591.

After a possible position as secretary or steward to Edward de Vere, 17th Earl of Oxford, he was supported by Henry Percy, 9th Earl of Northumberland. He was said to be a Catholic convert, by John Aubrey, but this is doubted by Christopher Hill. Aubrey's account also has him a close friend of Robert Hues, at the centre of the Northumberland circle. He left England and resided in Rotterdam, with his son. Hugh Trevor-Roper considers that he was a Catholic, and for that reason expelled from St John's. He also associates Hill with the plot of Sir Robert Basset. According to an account of Hues recorded by Obadiah Walker, Hill's son died and he then committed suicide.

John Donne satirized Hill in his Catalogus Librorum Aulicum, and he was attacked and mocked by Ben Jonson (epigram 133/134).

== Works ==
Philosophia epicurea, democritiana, theophrastica was a work on the classical atomism of Epicurus and skepticism. It consisted of 509 aphorisms, which drew on Bruno and Lullism, Neoplatonism and Paracelsus, as well as classical authors. It was published in 1601 (Paris), and in another edition in 1619 (Geneva). It included thoughts on an imaginary voyage to the Moon, a theme taken from Bruno. It also shows a close relation to Bruno's De Immenso and De Minimo. Other influences were Democritus, Hermes Trismegistus and William Gilbert. He was a Copernican, perhaps also following Francesco Patrizi. Hill, however, stops short of exploring atomism as a mechanistic philosophy. Robert Kargon considers that Hill was not, in strict terms, an Epicurean, reserving to Walter Charleton the first English exposition of Epicurean thought.

The Philosophia epicurea was known to John Donne, through Ben Jonson's copy. It was referenced in Robert Burton's Anatomy of Melancholy.

According to Robert Hues, other unpublished work followed Bruno.
