= Cawood Castle =

Castle in North Yorkshire, England

- North Yorkshire, England
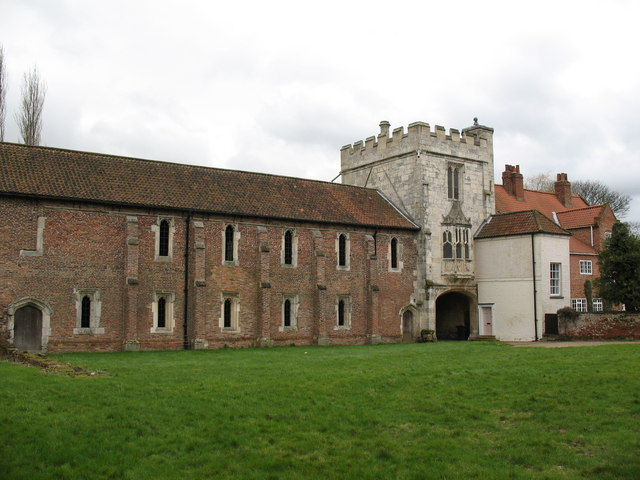
- Banqueting hall and gatehouse at Cawood Castle

Site information
- Type: Quadrangular castle
- Owner: Landmark Trust
- Open to the public: For holiday let

Location
- Shown within North Yorkshire
- Coordinates: 53.8315°N 1.1309°W
- Grid reference: grid reference SE573376

Site history
- Materials: Stone and brick

Listed Building – Grade I
- Designated: 5 December 1928
- Reference no.: 1011518

Cawood Castle is a grade I listed building in Cawood, a village in North Yorkshire, England. The surviving fifteenth-century structures formed part of a fortified medieval palace belonging to the Archbishops of York, which was dismantled in the aftermath of the English Civil War.

== History ==
The Saxon King Æthelstan probably built the first fortification at Cawood on the site of the present castle ruins. Cawood became an archiepiscopal residence by the twelfth century. A castle was first mentioned in 1181, and William de Grenfeld is credited with building the west end of the castle in 1306. It was converted into a quadrangular castle between 1374 and 1388. It was visited by many kings, including King John, who hunted game in nearby Bishop's Wood in the 13th century. Documents show that the palace was often improved. Among these improvements was the gatehouse, which was constructed by Archbishop John Kemp. It was constructed with stone from Huddlestone quarry near Tadcaster which supplied stone for York Minster.

George Neville became Archbishop of York in 1465 and held a feast at the castle. The Earl of Warwick, the Archbishop's brother, aided in the preparation of the feast and is said to have wanted a feast larger than the King's coronation feast. Guests included the Duke of Gloucester, the King's brother. The feast lasted several days and became known as the "Great Feast of Cawood" due to the size of it. Records from the feast show that a substantial quantity of food was consumed, including 104 oxen, 6 wild bulls, 400 swans, 1000 capons and 104 peacocks; 25,000 gallons of wine were consumed with the meal.

The castle was the main residence of Thomas Savage while he was Archbishop of York, and he died at Cawood Castle in September 1507. Cardinal Wolsey came to Cawood as Archbishop of York in 1530 and made himself popular with the villagers by putting right years of neglect. However, before he was installed as archbishop in York, the Earl of Northumberland arrested him on charges of high treason; Wolsey fell ill at Leicester on his way to London, and died. He therefore fulfilled Mother Shipton's prophecy, that he would see the towers of York Minster but would never be enthroned there.

In 1642, the English Civil War began and the castle was initially held by the Royalists. The castle was captured by the Parliamentarians; however the Earl of Newcastle briefly recaptured it for the Royalists in 1644. Shortly after, however, Lord Fairfax recaptured it and it was used as a prisoner of war camp. Once the war ended the castle was abandoned and destroyed, with only the farm buildings and parts of the wall remaining. The cellar was filled in with rubble and soil.

== Current status ==
The only remaining parts of the castle are the gatehouse and the banqueting hall. Stones from the destroyed castle were used in the construction of surrounding houses. The foundations of some other structures do remain as well as the castle's cellar, which was excavated in the 19th century.

The gatehouse served as a courthouse until the 1930s, before being used as an officers' mess and a building for the Home Guard during World War II.

The castle is now in the ownership of the Landmark Trust, which has restored the gatehouse as a holiday home, while leaving the two-storey banqueting hall sound and weathertight but not habitable. Outside the banqueting hall can be seen remains of other structures – there were more modern farm buildings and a wall along the road, which were removed when the Landmark Trust took over the castle and restored it.

The castle garth was bought by the parish council in the 1980s in order to keep it as an open space in the heart of the village. The garth is home to a population of great crested newts: at its centre is a pond, built as a skating pond in the 19th century. There are also remains of the medieval fish-ponds. The area has been enhanced with funding from the Local Heritage Initiative, a small grants scheme launched in 2000 to help communities bring their local heritage to life.

== See also ==
- Castles in Great Britain and Ireland
- List of castles in England
- Grade I listed buildings in North Yorkshire (district)
- Listed buildings in Cawood
