= Grindletonians =

Coordinates: 53.906°N 2.368°W

Founder
- John Wilson, Roger Brearley

Regions with significant populations
- Yorkshire and Lancashire, England

Religions
- Christianity

Scriptures
- Christian Bible

Languages
- English

The Grindletonians were a Puritan sect that arose in the town of Grindleton, at that time in the West Riding of Yorkshire, England, in around 1610. The sect remained active in the North of England until the 1660s. Its most notable leader was Roger Brearley (or Brereley). Grindletonian beliefs were Antinomian.

== History ==
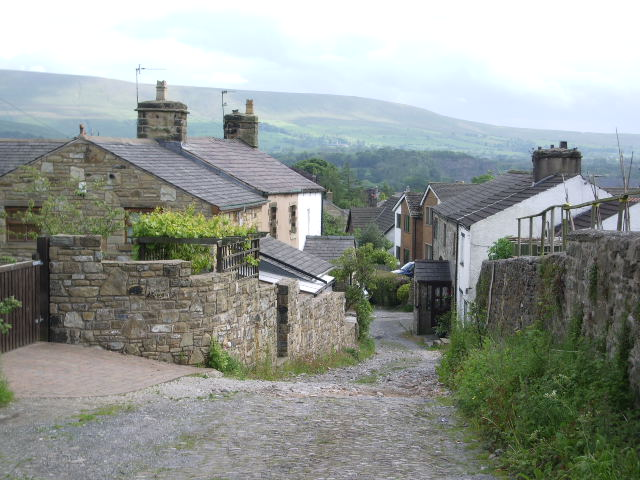
Grindleton in May 2007

John Wilson, who led the congregation at Kildwick before Grindletonianism appeared, has been called a religious radical and may have introduced some of the basic concepts of the sect. The community may therefore have held some Grindletonian beliefs before Brearley arrived.

Brearley, who was the curate at Grindleton from 1615 to 1622, was the main leader of the Grindletonians. John Everard (c. 1584–1641) was a friend of Brearley's and may have influenced him. Brearley had a local following, attracting worshippers from the nearby parish of Giggleswick, but became more widely known after the proceedings against him. He was brought before the High Commission of the Archdiocese of York in October 1616 to answer charges that he was a radical nonconformist, that he relied on the motion of the spirit and that he thought that all doubt about salvation could be removed from believers. He was also asked to reject fifty erroneous beliefs that he and his followers allegedly held. Brearley seems to have renounced his views and to have promised to conform in future, presumably in order to escape punishment.

Brearley left Grindleton in 1634 to teach at Kildwick, twenty miles away. His successor as curate at Grindleton, John Webster (1610-1683), taught ideas similar to Brearley's, and Grindletonianism continued to grow between 1615 and 1640, gaining a large number of followers in Lancashire and Yorkshire, and spinning off other antinomian sects. In 1635 John Webster, curate at Kildwick, was brought before a church court charged with being a Grindletonian.

A preacher named Robert Towne carried the Grindletonian message into western Yorkshire and eastern Lancashire in the 1640s, although he himself disavowed the label. The last known Grindletonian died in the 1680s.

== Beliefs ==
In a sermon preached at Paul's Cross on 11 February 1627, and published under the title The White Wolfe in 1627, Stephen Denison, minister of St. Catherine Cree, charged the "Gringltonian [sic] familists" with adhering nine points of antinomian tendency. These nine points are repeated from Denison by Pagitt (1645), and glanced at by Ross (1655).

Some of Brearley's ideas were probably drawn from the Theologia Germanica. His teachings were antinomian: He thought that the power of God's Spirit alone is sufficient to bring a person to salvation. Grindletonians thought that a true Christian who has the Spirit within them does not sin. The Grindletonians were close to the Familists in their beliefs. They thought the Spirit is privileged over the Letter (meaning the Bible), that anyone who has the inner light is qualified to preach, whether ordained or not, and that a person could live without sin and attain Heaven on Earth.

== Influences ==
Grindleton stands at the foot of Pendle Hill, where George Fox (1624–1691), the founder of Quakerism, received the visions that convinced him to launch his sect. A number of other unorthodox sects arose in the region around the same time. It is possible that Fox was influenced by Grindletonian thinking. The Quakers Francis Howgill (1618-69) and John Camm (1605-1657) were Grindletonians who became Seekers and then Quakers.

Antinomianism or Grindletonianism may also have had an influence on Anne Hutchinson (1591-1643).
