= Roger Brereley =

Roger Brereley (Brearley, Brierley etc.) (1586–1637) was an English clergyman, known as the founder of the Grindletonian sect. His actual views are known from surviving sermons, perhaps reconstituted from notes; those held by the Grindletonians may well have differed considerably from those attributed to them by opponents in polemics. Brereley was in his own view a supporter of Calvinistic orthodoxy, not a sectary, and he censures Jacobus Arminius.

== Life ==
He was born on 4 August 1586, at Marland, then a hamlet in the parish of Rochdale, where Thomas Brereley, his father, and Roger, his grandfather, were farmers. He had three brothers and two sisters younger than himself. His younger sister was married to Robert Doughty, headmaster of the grammar school at Wakefield. Brereley himself began life as a puritan. He took orders and became perpetual curate of Grindleton Chapel, in the parish of Mitton in Craven; Grindleton is about two miles north of Clitheroe. He held (in 1626) a close in Castleton, in the manor of Rochdale, which had belonged to his grandfather. His preaching was simple and spiritual, and his followers soon became distinguished as a group. Brereley himself, in his piece Of True Christian Liberty, writes:

And now men say, I'm deeply drown'd in schism,
Retyr'd from God's grace unto Grindletonism.

Some fifty charges were exhibited against Brereley at York by direction of the high commission, in his first appearance in 1617. This trial was one of two such occasions and was followed by another in 1627, still held before Archbishop Tobias Matthew, who died in 1628. Matthew sustained Brereley in the exercise of his ministry, and he preached in York Cathedral. In 1631 Brereley was instituted to the living of Burnley, Lancashire. He died in June 1637, and was buried 13 June. He married Ann Hardman in 1615 and left six children - Alice, Thomas, Mary, John, Roger & Abel. John and Roger were both ordained and served in different parishes in Lancashire; Abel died in 1696, when he is described as a chapman (trader). Alice kept her father's sermon notes, which she later showed to Josias Collier, who edited and published them.

== Works ==
His literary remains are:

- A Bundle of Soul-convincing, directing, and comforting Truths; clearly deduced from divers select texts of Holy Scripture, sermons printed for James Brown, bookseller in Glasgow, 1670 (this edition consists of twenty-seven sermons, and the biographical Epistle to the Reader, by J. C., identified as Josias Collier or Collyer, who says of the origin of the volume: 'After his death a few headnotes of some of his sermons came to my view,' perhaps implying that the notes were Brereley's own).
- Another edition, London, printed by J. R. for Samuel Sprunt, 1677, is probably a reprint from an earlier issue; it reckons the sermons as twenty-six in number, what is Sermon 22 in the 1670 edition being not numbered, but headed ' Exposition,' &c. (it is on the beatitudes). It contains also, after the sermons, pieces in verse: The Preface of Mr. Brierly; Of True Christian Liberty; The Lord's Reply in four sections alternating with three headed The Soul's Answer; The Song of the Soul's Freedom, Self Civil War.

== Grindletonians and their reputation ==
Brereley had a local following, attracting worshippers from the nearby Giggleswick parish of Christopher Shute, but became more widely known after the proceedings against him. In 1618 the diarist Nicholas Assheton records the burial of one John Swinglehurst as of a follower of 'Brierley'. Thomas Shephard knew of him in 1622.

In a sermon preached at Paul's Cross on 11 February 1627, and published under the title of The White Wolfe, 1627, Stephen Denison, minister of St. Catherine Cree, charges the 'Gringltonian (sic) familists' with holding nine points of an antinomian tendency. These nine points are repeated from Denison by Ephraim Pagitt in his Heresiography (2nd ed. 1645, p. 89), and glanced at by Alexander Ross, Πανσεβεια (2nd ed. 1655, p. 365). In 1635 John Webster, curate at Kildwick, was before a church court charged with being a Grindletonian, and simultaneously in New England John Winthrop thought that Anne Hutchinson was one. The last known Grindletonian died in the 1680s.

== In Fiction ==
A fictional portrayal of Brereley is found in Farmer's Son (2018) by Walter King This takes Brereley's story from his arrival in Gisburne in 1613 as assistant to the vicar, Rev. Henry Hoyle, through his founding of the congregation in a redundant chapel at Grindleton, to his return from imprisonment in York, where he faced charges of heterodoxy, in October 1617.
