= Drexel Collection =

Music collection of New York Public Library

The Drexel Collection is a collection of over 6,000 volumes of books about music and musical scores owned by the Music Division of The New York Public Library. Donated by Joseph W. Drexel in 1888 to the Lenox Library (which later became The New York Public Library), the collection, located today at the New York Public Library for the Performing Arts, is rich with materials on music theory and music history as well as other musical subjects. It contains many rare books and includes a number of significant 17th-century English music manuscripts.

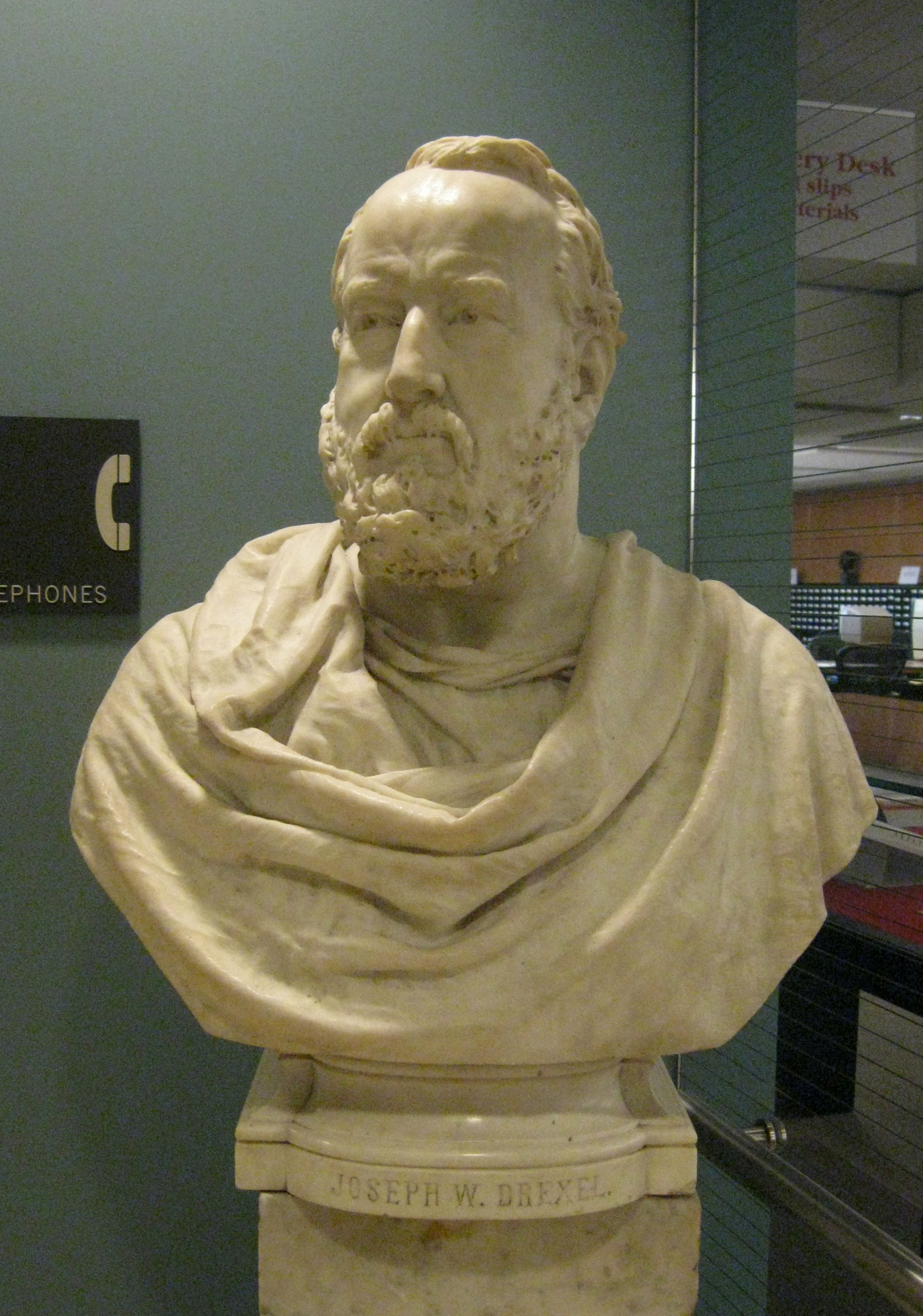
Bust of Joseph W. Drexel by John Quincy Adams Ward (1889), located at the 3rd floor entrance of the New York Public Library for the Performing Arts

== Origins ==
The musical library of Joseph W. Drexel had its origins in the library of Henry F. Albrecht (1822–1875). Born in Germany and trained as a musician, Albrecht's passion for collecting books on music had been fueled by Siegfried Dehn, musician and librarian of the Royal Library (today the Berlin State Library), whom he had met in Berlin. Albrecht emigrated to the United States in 1848 where he was one of the organizers of the Germania Musical Society, a touring orchestra in which he was the second clarinetist. Visiting many locations in the United States enabled Albrecht to collect music literature and scores. The Society disbanded in 1854, while in residence at Newport, Rhode Island.

That year, Albrecht decided to join the Icarians in Nauvoo, Illinois, which required that members donate all their belongings. Albrecht created an inventory of his collection of 661 volumes, intending to donate them to the Icarians. In writing about the demise of the Germania Musical Society and Albrecht's plans, John Sullivan Dwight remarked "His library of music and of musical books, for one collected by so young a man, is really quite a wonder." Quoting from an unidentified article in the Newport Daily News, he added: "It is a well known fact that libraries of this kind are very rare" and that Albrecht's was "one of the most complete in America." The Icarian community at Nauvoo failed by 1856 and its members dispersed.

In 1858, Albrecht sold his library to Joseph W. Drexel and moved to Philadelphia. Drexel was a banker in the midst of a very profitable career as a partner in the firm Drexel, Morgan & Co. With Albrecht's assistance, Drexel kept adding to his library. In 1865, he purchased portions of the library of Dr. Rene La Roche (1795–1872) (also mentioned as a competing library in Dwight's article) which contained English, French, and Latin publications.

In 1869, Drexel published (with Albrecht's assistance) a catalog of the published works in his collection which at the time contained 2,245 volumes. Additional volumes inventorying musical autographs, musical scores, and iconography were planned but were never published. Sometimes Drexel's purchases made for social news. On November 17, 1876, the New York Herald Tribune announced that Drexel had purchased a manuscript missal of the fifteenth century written on vellum for $177.50.

The most important later addition to Drexel's library was the purchase of a major portion of the library of Edward F. Rimbault which was auctioned in 1877. The significance of the library even merited a newspaper announcement. Rimbault's valuable collection was well-known, and it was with dismay that The Musical Times reported: "all [the English unica] should have been purchased for the British Museum: now unfortunately it is too late, as a large proportion are on their way to New York." (Purchases for Drexel at the Rimbault auction were made by the London firm of Joseph Sabin & Sons.)

In 1877, Drexel also instructed Sabin to purchase at least two volumes from the estate of musicologist Edmond de Coussemaker (Aristoxenos's Auctores musices antiquissimi (1616) and Vincenzo Galilei’s Dialogo (1581), as well as volumes from the estate of Henry Aimé Ouvry and several other minor figures. After this year his acquisitions appeared nearly to stop, except for purchases of rare books in 1880 from Ludwig Rosenthal’s Catalogue XXVI (purchased through the New York dealer F. W. Christern).

Though Drexel was an active concert and opera attendee in the years of his retirement, very few contemporary musical works are present in his collection.

== Death and donation to Lenox Library ==
An active philanthropist and a board member of several institutions after his retirement in 1877, Drexel made known his intention was that his library be donated to the Lenox Library upon his death. He died during the Great Blizzard of 1888. It was with surprise that newspapers noted that his will contained only a single bequest to a charitable organization:

All that portion of my library which consists of works relating to the science of music, also all musical compositions and treatises on other works on musical subjects" [be given to the Lenox Library] "upon the express condition that the said trustees of The Lenox Library shall sign and deliver to my executors, hereinafter named, a written acceptance of the said portion of my library, and an agreement to keep the same separated from all other books or collections of books, and to preserve the same in separate shelves or cases, to be labeled "Drexel Musical Library."

"The collection of musical works in his library is considered one of the finest in the United States..." reported the New York Herald in its obituary of Drexel. The trustees of the Lenox Library voted on June 7, 1888, to accept the bequest.

When the Lenox Library merged with the Astor Library and the Tilden Trust in 1895 to form The New York Public Library, the Drexel Collection was organized by subject based on the classification system of John Shaw Billings, the first director of the newly formed library. As stipulated by Drexel's will, his collection was given call numbers distinct from the rest of the library in the form of consecutive numbering, 1 through 6013 (some volumes contained many pamphlets or smaller works bound together). Although it has moved several times since its inception, the Music Division continues to house the Drexel Collection under special conditions for reasons of preservation.

== Contents ==
Albrecht's interests were German music theory and history, as well as contemporaneous German and American publications. Once in the hands of Drexel, he sought to enhance publications in French. Sixteenth century music theory is well represented. Very little 16th century music is present, though the collection contains Baltazar de Beaujoyeulx 'Ballet de la Reine" from 1582, work known as a forerunner of opera.

Thanks to the purchases from the Rimbault sale, the Drexel Collection has a number of unique sources (many of them manuscripts) of early seventeenth-century English music:

- Drexel 3976 – "The rare theatrical, & other compositions" – a compilation of music by Matthew Locke
- Drexel 4041 – a collection of English songs compiled before 1649, probably copied for Lord Ferrers.
- Drexel 4175 – known as Ann Twice, Her Booke
- Drexel 4180—4185 – a collection of six part books
- Drexel 4257 – known as John Gamble's Commonplace Book
- Drexel 4302 – known as Francis Sambrooke, His Booke
- Drexel 5061 – Ayres for viols – containing sources for works by Henry Purcell and others
- Drexel 5120 – Parthenia Inviolata, the only known copy of the second volume of keyboard music published in England
- Drexel 5609 – an eighteenth-century collection of English dance music
- Drexel 5611 – English keyboard music of the seventeenth century
- Drexel 5612 – a collection of dance music from seventeenth-century England
- Drexel 5856 – a collection of music copied by John Christopher Smith, one of Handel's copyists
- Drexel 5871 – the manuscript of 27 works for viola da gamba by Carl Friedrich Abel

== Publications ==
The following list contains selected publications that have depended on unique materials from the Drexel Collection.

- Abel, Karl Friedrich. 27 Pieces for the Viola da Gamba: New York Public Library Ms. Drexel 5871. Facsimile Series for Scholars and Musicians. Peer, Belgium: Alamire, 1993. ISBN 978-90-6853-079-7.
- Morley, Thomas. The first book of consort lessons, collected by Thomas Morley, 1599 & 1611. Reconstructed and edited with an introduction and critical notes by Sydney Beck, foreword by Carleton Sprague Smith. New York: Published for the New York Public Library by C.F. Peters Corp., 1959.
- Parthenia in-violata: or, Mayden-musicke, for the virginalls and bass-viol / selected by Robert Hole: Facsimile of the Unique Copy in the New York Public Library. New York: New York Public Library, 1961.
