= Drexel 3976 =

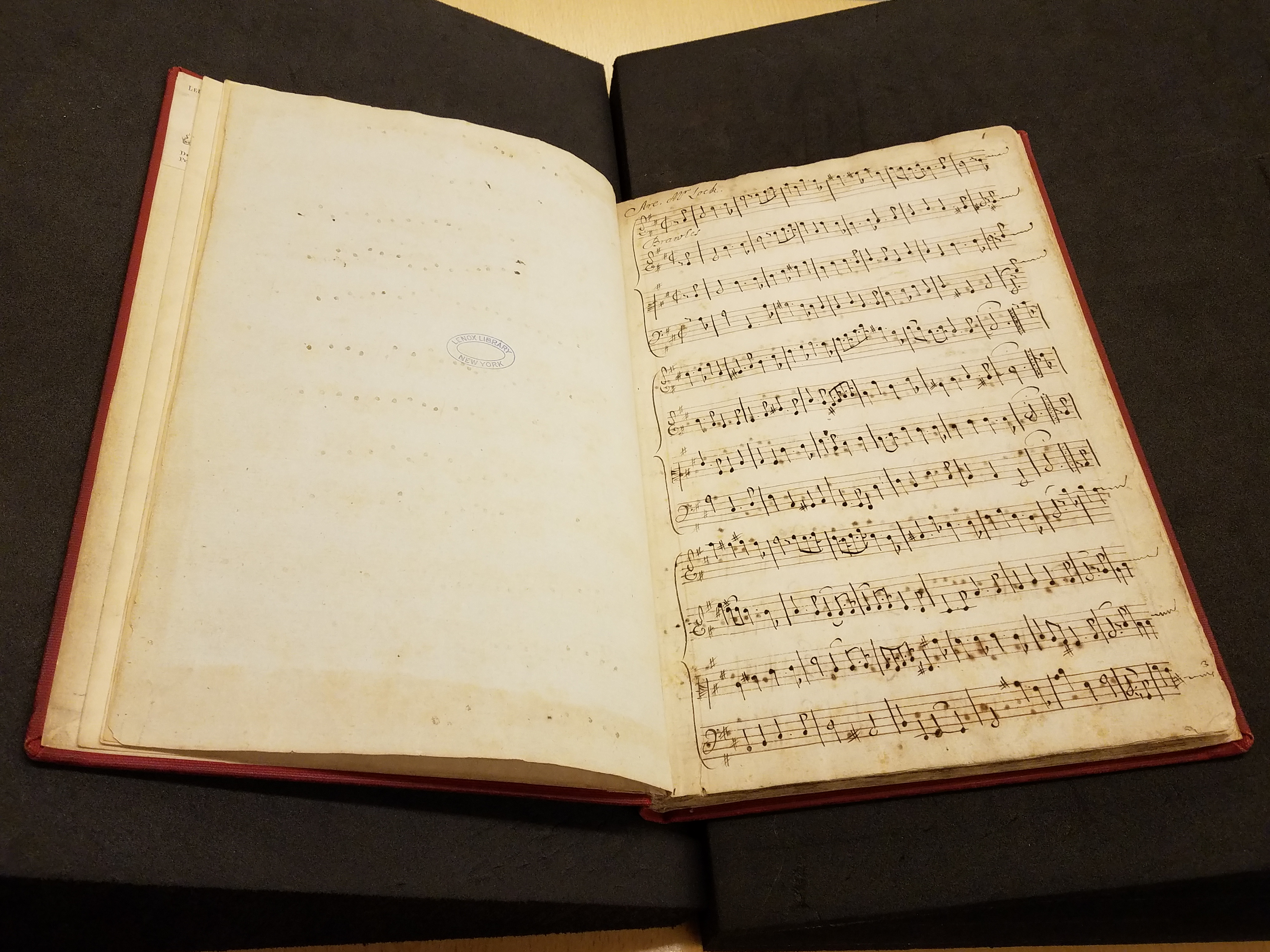
- Also known as: The Rare Theatrical
- Type: Music manuscript
- Date: late 17th century
- Place of origin: England
- Author: Matthew Locke

Drexel 3976, also known as The Rare Theatrical (based on an inscription from a former owner), is a 17th-century music manuscript compilation of works by the composer Matthew Locke, considered by some to be "the father of all Restoration dramatic music." The manuscript is a significant source of Locke's instrumental dramatic music with many works not known through any other source, although the contexts of the individual works and the names of the plays which they are from has not been documented.

Belonging to the New York Public Library, it forms part of the Music Division's Drexel Collection, located at the New York Public Library for the Performing Arts. Following traditional library practice, its name is derived from its call number.

== Date ==
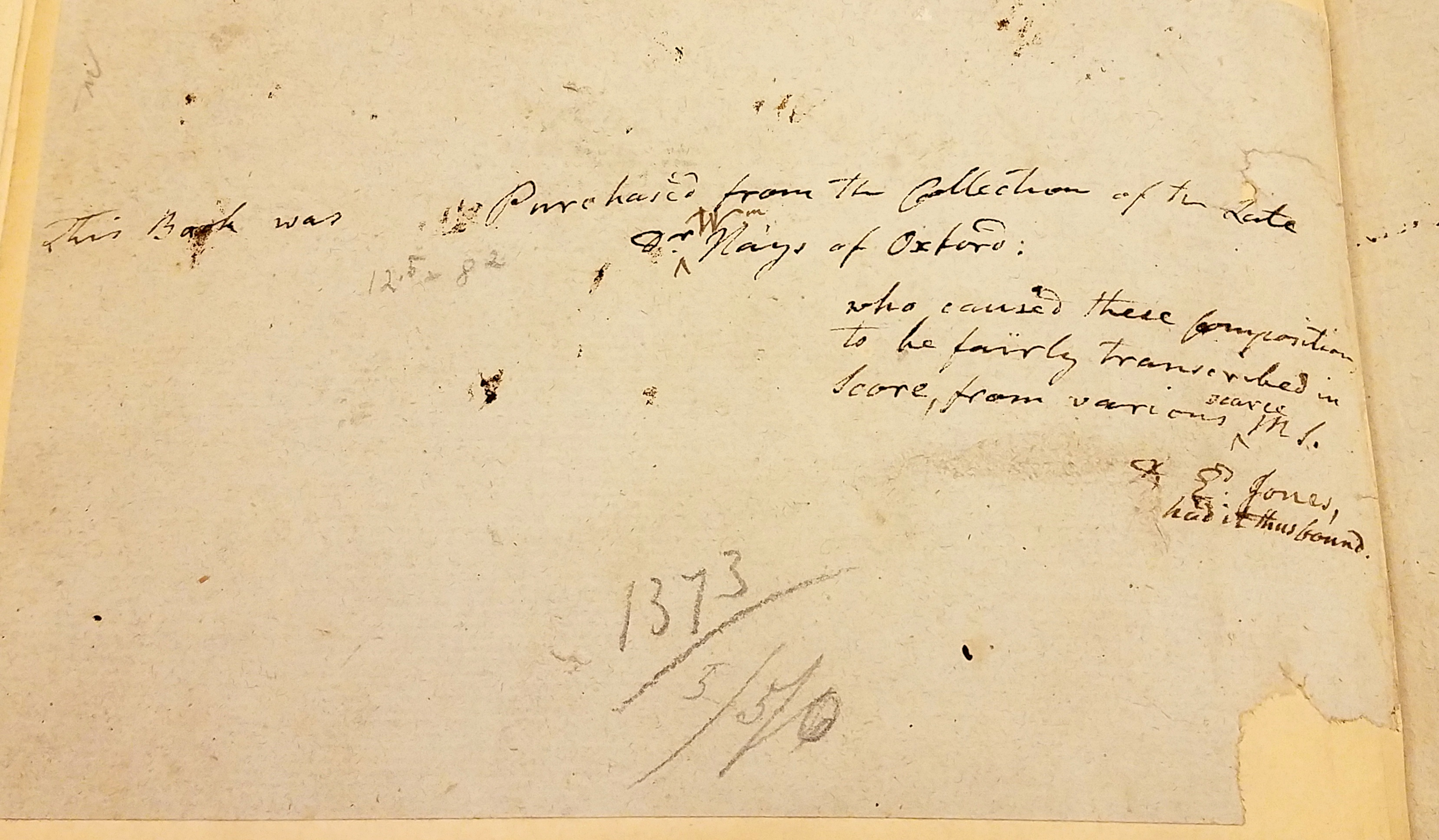
Opening inscription On Drexel 3976 by Edward Jones attributing the work to William Hays. "1373" is the lot number under which the manuscript was sold at the sale of Edward F. Rimbault's library

A handwritten statement (now pasted on the initial leaf) by Edward Jones (1752–1824) states:

This Book was Purchased from the Collection of the Late Dr. Wm. Hays of Oxford: who caused these Compositions to be fairly transcribed in Score, from various scarce MS. & Ed. Jones, had it thus bound.

Jones once owned the manuscript and had it bound or rebound. (The current owner, the New York Public Library, had the volume rebound in 1937 and no evidence of previous bindings exist. Jones's written comments have been preserved and are pasted on new flyleaves at the beginning of the volume.) Jones believed the manuscript was copied by or for William Hayes (1706–1777), which would mean the work dates from the mid-18th century. (Jones's binding is no longer extant; the current binding was created by the Library.) While acknowledging that Hayes might have owned the manuscript, Musicologist Peter Holman strongly cast doubt on the 18th century dating based on three reasons. First, Holman described the very orderly progression of works by key as being typical of the Restoration period; such organization had ceased by 1700. Secondly, characteristics of the handwriting in its notation of music and in particular key signatures and time signatures is typical of the 17th century. Lastly, Holman observed a consistent paper watermark indicating French or Dutch paper of the late 17th century. Holman hypothesized that the manuscript was written by a near-contemporary of Locke.

== Title ==
The following page also contains an inscription by Jones which Holman identified as a title:

The Rare Theatrical, & other Compositions by Mr. Matthew Lock, transcribed in Score from various M.S. – viz. Overtures, Symphonies, Brawles, Gavotts, Fantasticks, Corants, act Tunes, Curtain Tunes, Sarabands, Almands, Galliards, Lilks, Hornpipes, & other Compositions.

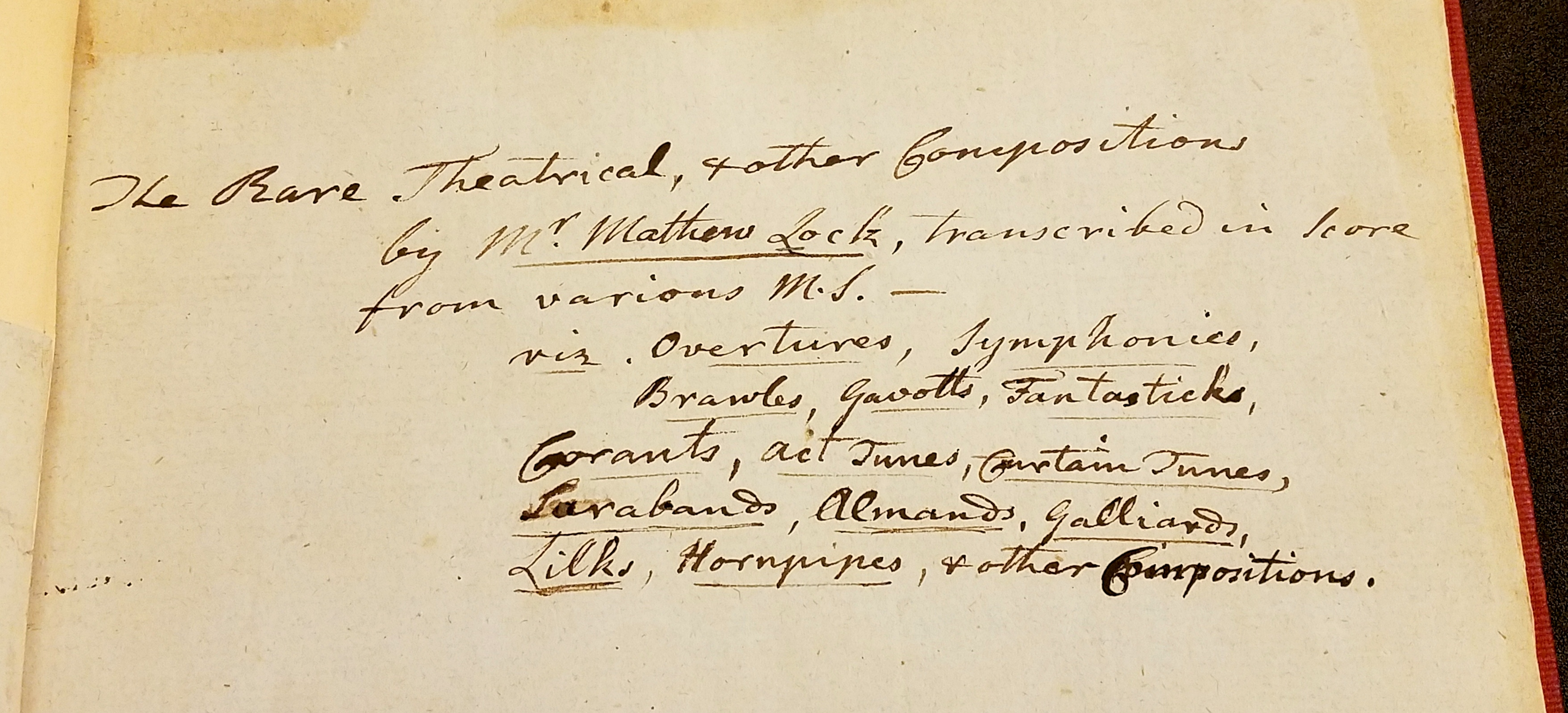
Second inscription on Drexel 3976 by Edward Jones providing the name "The Rare Theatrical" and a brief description of its contents

Holman observed that the title "The Rare Theatrical" was written in Edward Jones's hand and that in this case, Jones's use of the word "rare" refers not to scarcity, but to unusually high quality. He concluded that the title probably originated with the copyist and that Jones's inscription could have preserved that earlier title.

== Provenance ==
Holman doubted Jones's attribution of Hayes as the compiler since the manuscript displays notational and organizational characteristics of 17th-century manuscripts, rather than that of the 18th century.

Upon Jones's passing his collection was sold at auction in 1825. In the auction catalog of Jones's library, this volume is identified as lot 452. Musicologist Robert Klakowich hypothesized that it could have been purchased from the Jones's auction by Edward Francis Rimbault's father, Stephen Francis Rimbault (1773–1837). Holman was able to examine Sotheby's copy of the catalogue which contained the names of the buyers. The buyer for this manuscript is identified only as "Palmer" who purchased this volume along with Locke's Cupid and Death and a score for Macbeth (formerly thought to be composed by Locke but now attributed to Richard Leveridge) for four shillings.

Edward Francis Rimbault was a musicologist and a voracious collector of British manuscripts, so it is not surprising that the manuscript would eventually become one of his holdings. After Rimbault's death in 1876, the manuscript was listed as lot 1373 in the 1877 auction catalog of his estate. Purchased for £5/5s the manuscript was one of about 600 lots acquired by Joseph Sabin acting for Philadelphia-born financier Joseph W. Drexel, who had already amassed a large music library. Upon Drexel's death, he bequeathed his music library to The Lenox Library. When the Lenox Library merged with the Astor Library to become the New York Public Library, the Drexel Collection became the basis for one of its founding units, the Music Division. Today, Drexel 3796 is part of the Drexel Collection in the Music Division, now located at the New York Public Library for the Performing Arts at Lincoln Center.

== Physical description ==
The manuscript measures 32.1 cm × 21 cm × 0.9 cm (1.053 ft × 0.689 ft × 0.030 ft). With its current binding it measures 32.8 cm × 21.8 cm × 1.5 cm (1.076 ft × 0.715 ft × 0.049 ft).

== Handwriting ==
Holman determined that the manuscript's handwriting indicates it was written in the late seventeenth century. Conventional symbols such the type of clefs, the shape of the notes and double bars are characteristic of the Restoration. (By 1700 these symbols had become obsolete.)

Holman surmised that the manuscript was probably written by a near-contemporary of Matthew Locke. His support for this hypothesis is based on a uniform watermark throughout the manuscript, that of a seven-pointed foolscap, typically found in French and Dutch paper of the late seventeenth century.

Although the name of the copyist is unknown, Holman derived information about him from various sources. He noted that it is the same copyist as another volume in the New York Public Library, Drexel 5061 and that the provenance of that volume is similar to Drexel 3976, stemming from William Hayes. Thus he derived information about the copyist of Drexel 3976 from Drexel 5061. Noting that the copyist must have copied works of Henry Purcell directly from the composer's manuscript, Holman hypothesizes that the copyist might have been in direct contact with Locke.

Holman infers that the copyist could be a member of the family of composer Bartholomew Isaack, noting that one of his brothers, William, was a professional copyist (William Isaack was the copyist of a large collection of anthems now in the Fitzwilliam Museum as Music MS 117).

Wood noted that the copyist, although experienced, was not always accurate.

== Content ==
=== Scoring ===
Almost all the music in Drexel 3976 is scored for four parts using treble, alto, tenor and bass clefs. Based on a contemporary document, Holman explained that this scoring would result in six violins, six countertenors, six tenors and six basses. The rationale for this is that scoring for a single violin, two violas and bass is commonly found in seventeenth-century dance music, particularly in the courts of France, Sweden as well as German and Austrian courts. More importantly, this was the scoring used by the violin band of the English court known as the Twenty-Four Violins. Holman surmised that the manuscript was probably derived from the repertory of the Twenty-Four Violins who played both theatrical and non-theatrical music. Although Holman could not say exactly when chamber music shifted from having two violas to having two violins, he observed that the four works in Drexel 3976 that also appear in The Broken Consort have two violins and a single viola, indicating that the transition had begun to take place. (Similar works by Henry Purcell, Locke's successor at court, are primarily for two violins and viola, indicating the transition was nearly completed.)

Whether continuo instruments (harpsichord and theorbo) accompanied the theatrical music, Holman found sources with somewhat conflicting information. While noting that Thomas Shadwell's version of the play Macbeth specifically describes the position of the instruments including "harpsicals" and a theorbo, other evidence shows that theater music did not always include continuo players. Noting that Drexel 3976 does not contain any figured bass, Holman concludes that the Twenty-Four Violins did not play with continuo players, even when they were available.

As to whether Baroque oboe and recorder were used, based on evidence of practice in contemporary theatrical works, Holman concludes "...it is likely that some of the pieces in The Rare Theatrical were played with wind instruments, presumably doubling the outer parts in the French manner."

=== Theatrical music ===
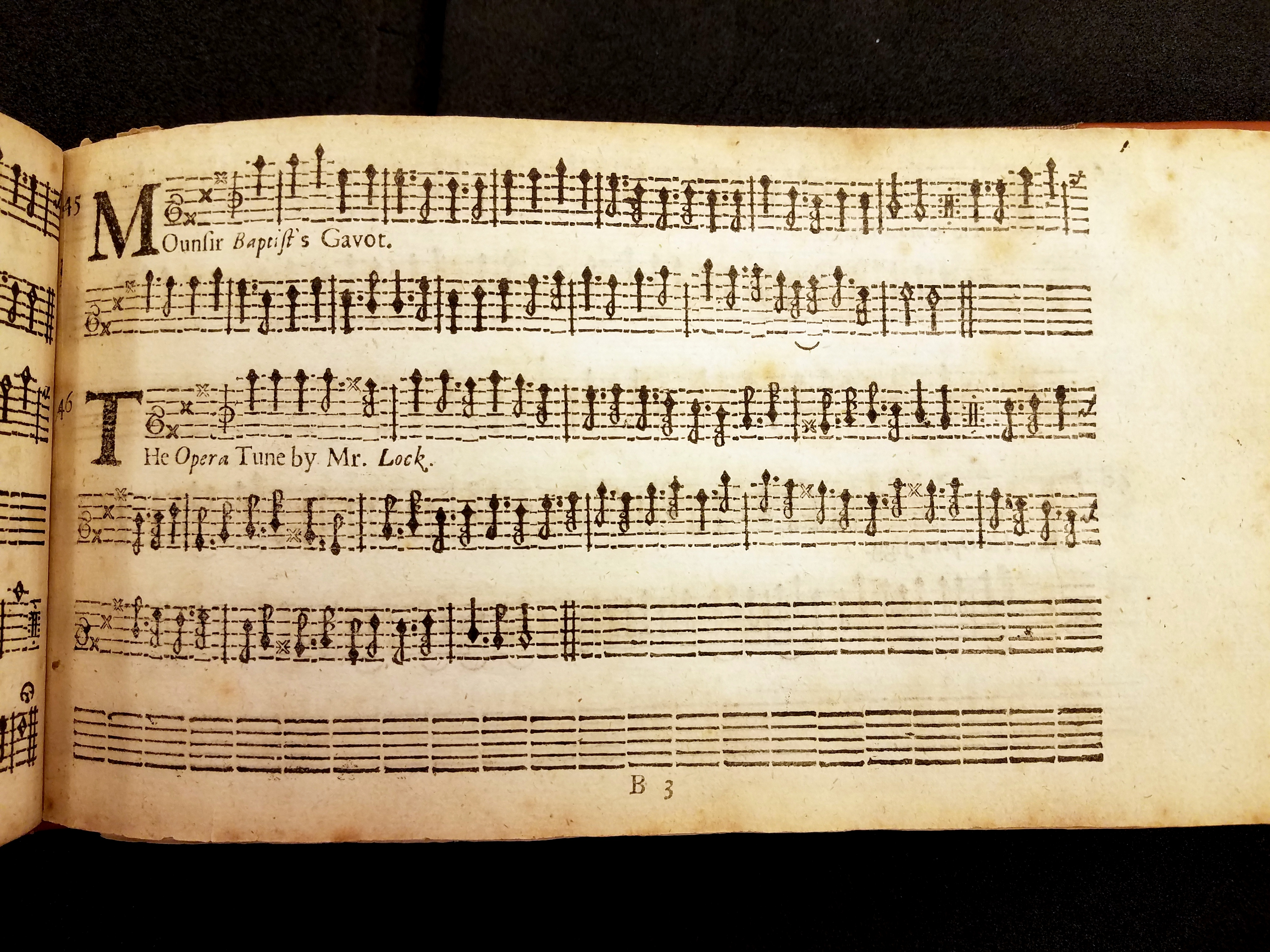
"The Opera Tune by Mr. Lock" as it appears in the 1669 edition of Apollo's Banquet, as a melodic line

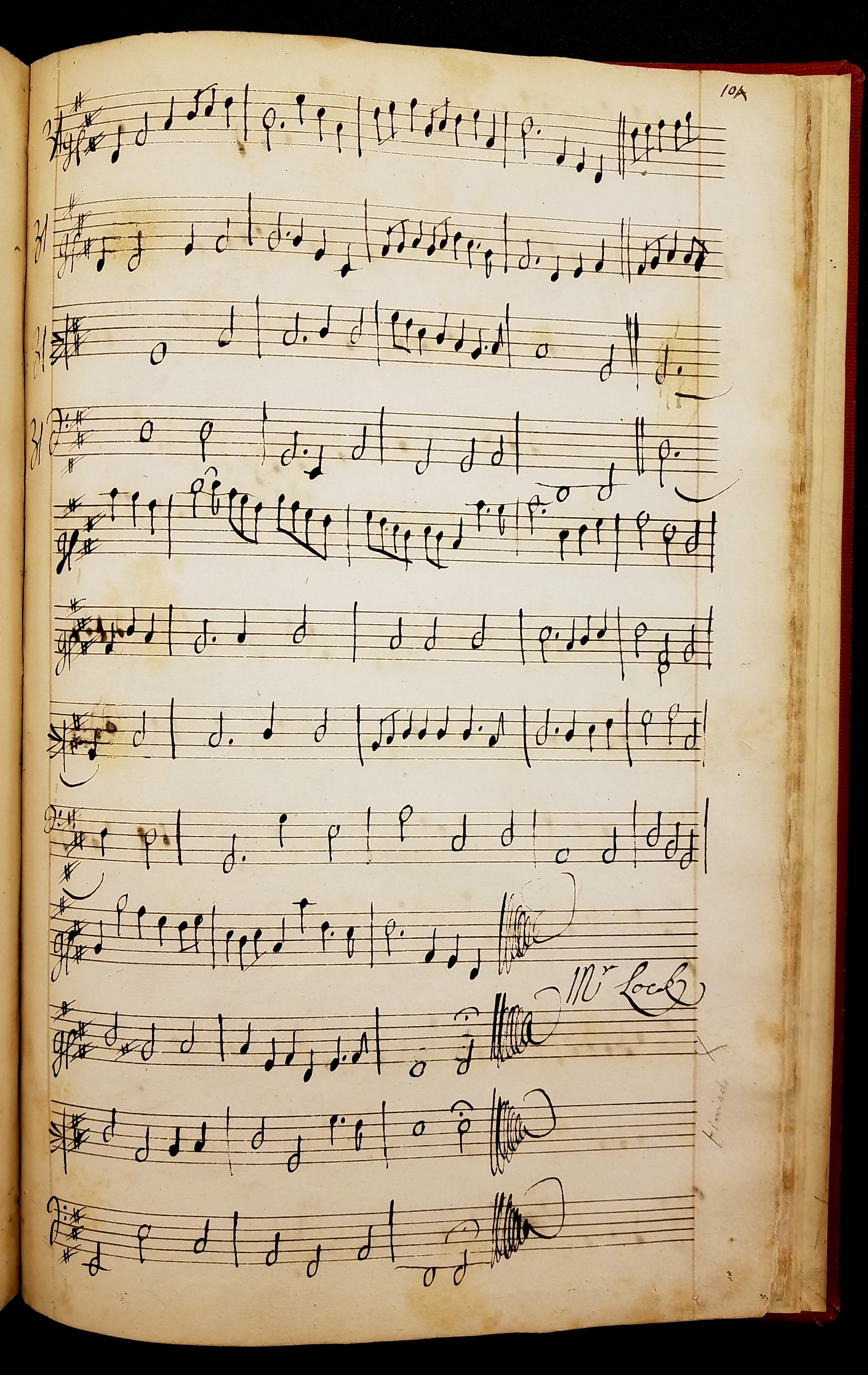
"The Opera Tune" as it appears in Drexel 3976, page 104, for four string parts

"By the Restoration in 1660, Locke was England's leading composer."

Locke was known to have written music for at least eleven and possibly as many as twenty dramatic works, which would have resulted in over 100 instrumental movements.

Holman observed that the copyist was probably working from scores (rather than parts) in creating Drexel 3976. He notes that on a few occasions the copyist erroneously copied the wrong part in to the score, and chose to cross out the score and start again.

Holman described the copyist as an experienced copyist who was working "two stages removed" from Locke's manuscript scores. Based on his experience in observe contemporaneous scores starting with works in G major and G minor, Holman reasoned that the copyist was working from incomplete sources. (The manuscript itself does not show evidence of having its initial pages removed.)

From its title we know that "The Rare Theatrical" contains music for theatre works. The lack of identifying titles for each work makes it hard to associate any composition with any specific play.

Holman was frustrated by the organization of "The Rare Theatrical." He knew that composers did not feel a need to maintain the same key for music heard during the intervals. But "The Rare Theatrical" is organized by key. Holman reasoned that, just as the copyist was a few stages away from the original manuscripts, so too the organization of the various works was also at some remove from their original contexts.

Holman observed that three of the original seven sections of the manuscript are missing. He hypothesized that it once could have contained as many as twenty-three theatre suites, and thus could have made a near-comprehensive collection of Locke's theatre music.

Homan noted that many of Locke's "curtain tunes" functioned like overtures and were to be played prior to the stage action. In terms of their structure, Holman noted that many of them resemble the typical form found in French overtures (consisting of two contrasting parts). Despite this French influence, Locke's works in "The Rare Theatrical" are labeled "curtain tunes." Beginning in the 1680s would English composer use the word "overture" with greater frequency. Holman found greater interest in those curtain tunes that do not conform to the French form.

Of the title, the meaning of the word "theatrical" refers to a collection music from the theatre, perhaps characteristic of grammatical irregularities sometimes found in the Restoration period. The word "rare" was used in the seventeenth century to indicate "uncommon excellence or merit." Holman suggests that if Locke did not designate the collection with that title (not impossible, given his apparently high opinion of himself), it could have derived from an early owner of the collection. Holman states the possibility that Edward Jones might have rescued the original title when he had the collection rebound.

=== Non-theatrical music ===
From Jones's description we know that Drexel 3976 also contains works that do not have theatrical origins. "The Rare Theatrical" contains six "brawls" (or branles). Branles were not used for theatre music; the ones in Drexel 3976 were not included by Locke in his collections of chamber music.

Locke's branles exhibit a similar formal structure: they open with two six-bar phrases in duple time, then a "second brawl" of eight measures in triple time, followed by a "leading brawl" of two six-bar sections. The suites conclude with a gavotte in two sections. This is also the pattern used by many of Locke's contemporaries. Placing Locke's branles in context, Holman concluded that Locke successfully integrated the English disjunct melodic style with the French sense of elegance and predictable patterns. The form would find full flower in Henry Purcell's music.

== Table of contents ==
Number	Harding	Page	Title	Key	Concordance
1	196	1	A re. Mr. Lock		
		1–2	Brawles	A	
		2	2d Brawle	A	
		2–3	[leading brawl]	A	
		3–4	Gavott	A	Apollo's Banquet (1670), no. 14, "The Opera Tune by Mr. Lock"; The Dancing Master (1665), no. 80, "Gavott"; Tripla Concordia (1677), no. 6, "Gavat" (a3 in G)
2	197	4–5	The Fantastick	a	
		5–6	Corant	a	
3	198	7–8	Running Almand	a	
4	199	8–9	Ayre	a	The Pleasant Companion (1672, 1680, 1682), no. 26, "Gavot by Mr. Math. Locke"
5	200	9–10	Symphony	a	Tripla Concordia (1677), no. 7, "M. Lock" (a3 in g, first two sections only)
6	201	10	Symphony	a	
7	202	11	Act Tune	a	
8		12	Jane Shore	A	Apollo's Banquet (1678), no. 78, "Jane Shore"
		13	B mi Mr. Lock		
9	204	13–14	Brawles	B♭	
		14	2d Brawl	B♭	
		14–15	[leading brawl]	B♭	
		15–16	Gavott	B♭	
10	205	17	Corant	B♭	
11	206	18	Saraband	B♭	
		18–19	[conclusion]		
12	207	19–20	Almand	B♭	
13	208	20–21	Galliard	B♭	
14	209	21–22	Lilk	B♭	
		22–23	Saraband	B♭	Cupid and Death (1659), 12–13 (a3 in A)
15	210	23–24	Curtain Tune	B♭	
16	211	25	[roundo]	B♭	
17	212	26	[jig]	Bb	Apollo's Banquet (1678), no. 5, "A Theatre Jigg"
18	213	27–28	Curtain Tune	B♭	
		29	C Fa ut. Mr. Lock		
19	214	29–30	[ayre]	C	The Broken Consort, no. 11, "Ayre" (a3)
20	215	30–31	[saraband]	C	The Broken Consort, no. 12, "Saraband" (a3)
21	216	31–34	Curtain Tune	C	
		34–35	Corant	C	
22	217	35–36	Corant	C	
23	218	36–37	Curtain Tune	C	
24	219	38–39	[curtain tune]	C	
25	220	39–42	Curtain Tune	C	Add. 31431, folios 62v-3, "Curtaine tune / Mathew Locke" (a3)
26	221	43–44	Curtain Tune	C	
27	222	45–46	Brawles	C	
		46	2d Brawle	C	
		46–47	Leading Brawl	C	
		47–48	Gavott	C	
28	223	48–49	[saraband]	C	
29	224	49–51	Brawles	c	
		51	2d Brawle	c	
		51–52	Leading Brawl	c	
		52–53	Gavot	c	
30	225	53–55	[ayre]	c	
31	226	55–56	[almand]	C	
32	227	56–57	[hornpipe]	C	Melothesia, p. 18, "Jig"/"M.L."
		57	D. sol. Re. Mr Lock		
33	228	57–58	Brawles	d	
		58–59	[second brawl]	d	
		59	[leading brawl]	d	
		59–60	[gavot]	d	
34	229	60–61	[corant]	d	
35	230	61–62	[corant]	d	
36	231	62–63	Running Almand	d	
37	232	63–65	Saraband	d	
38	233	64–66	Almand	d	
39	234	66–67	Corant	d	
40	235	67	Running Almand	d	
41	236	[68–69]	[jig]	d	
42	237	70–71	Almand	d	
43	238	71–72	Corant	d	
44	239	72	Ayre	d	
45	240	73–74	[jig]	d	
46	241	74	Saraband	d	
47	242	75–76	Ayre	d	The Broken Consort II, no. 8, [Ayre] (a3)
48	243	76–78	[galliard]	d	The Broken Consort II, no. 9, "Galliard" (a3)
49	244	78–79	Hornepipe	d	
50	245	79–80	Gavot	d	
51	246	80–81	Curtain Tune	d	
52	247	82	Corant	d	
53	248	82–83	[jig]	d	
54	249	84	[jig]	d	
55	250	85	[jig]	d	
56	251	85–87	Almand	d	
57	252	87–88	Corant	d	
58	253	88–89	[jig]	d	Apollo's Banquet (1670), no. 64, "She would if she could"
59	254	89–90	Corant	d	
60	255	90–92	Almand	d	Mus 1066, folio 1, "Allman Mr Math Locke"
61		92–93	Corant	d	Mus. Sch. C 44, folios 2, 10, 12, 14–16, "Courante" (a3); Mus 1066, folio F, "Corand Mr Math Locke"; Ms. 5777, folio 5v, "Corrant Mr Locke"
62		93	Saraband	d	Mus 1066, folio 1v, "Saraband Mr. Math Lock"
63		94	Gavott	d	Mus 1066, folio 2, "Gavat"
64		95–96	Curtain Tune	d	Mus 1066, folio 2, "tune"/"Mr. Math Locke"
65	256	96	[gavot]	d	Ms. 5777, folio 6, "Tune Mr. Locke"
66	257	97–98	[brawles]	D	
		98	[second brawl]	D	
		98–99	[leading brawl]	D	
		99–100	[gavot]	D	
67	258	100–101	[corant]	D	
68	259	101–102	[corant]	D	
69	260	102–103	[curtain tune?]	D	See no. 73, strains 2 & 3
70	261	104	[hornpipe]	D	Apollo's Banquet (1670), no. 34; Apollo's Banquet (1678), no. 106; Apollo's Banquet (1687), no. 66, "A Hornpipe"
71	262	105	[jig]	D	
72	263	106–107	[curtain tune]	D	
73	264	108–110	[curtain tune]	D	See no. 69, lacking strain 1
74	265	111–112	[ayre]	D	
75	266	112–113	[curtain tune?]	D	
		113	[jig hornpipe]	D	Apollo's Banquet (1670), no. 35, "A Jigg Hornpipe"
76	267	114	[saraband?]	D	
77	268	114–115	[ayre]	D	
78	269	116–117	[jig]	D	

== Works consulted ==
- Bailey, Candace (2000), "New York Public Library Drexel MS 5611", Fontes Artis Musicae, 47 (1): 51–67, JSTOR 23509042
- Cholij, Irena (1990), "The Rare Theatrical by Matthew Locke; Choice Ayres, Songs and Dialogues by John Playford; Pyramus and Thisbe by John Frederick Lampe; Three Birthday Odes for Prince George by William Boyce", Early Music, 18 (4), London: Oxford University Press: 655, 657, doi:10.1093/earlyj/XVIII.4.655, JSTOR 3127999 [review]
- Lefkowitz, Murray (1986–1987), "Review: Dramatic Music by Locke", Journal of the Royal Musical Association, 112 (4), London: Taylor & Francis: 335–339, doi:10.1093/jrma/112.2.335, JSTOR 797946
- Locke, Matthew (1989), Holman, Peter (ed.), The Rare Theatrical: New York Public Library, Drexel MS 3976, Music for London Entertainment, 1660–1800. Series A. Music for plays, 1660–1714, vol. 4, London: Stainer & Bell, ISBN 9780852497685 [facsimile edition]
- Wood, Bruce (1990), "The Rare Theatrical: New York Public Library, Drexel MS 3976 by Matthew Locke", Music & Letters, 71 (4), London: Oxford University Press: 613–616, JSTOR 736869 [review]
