= Drexel 5856 =

- New York Public Library for the Performing Arts
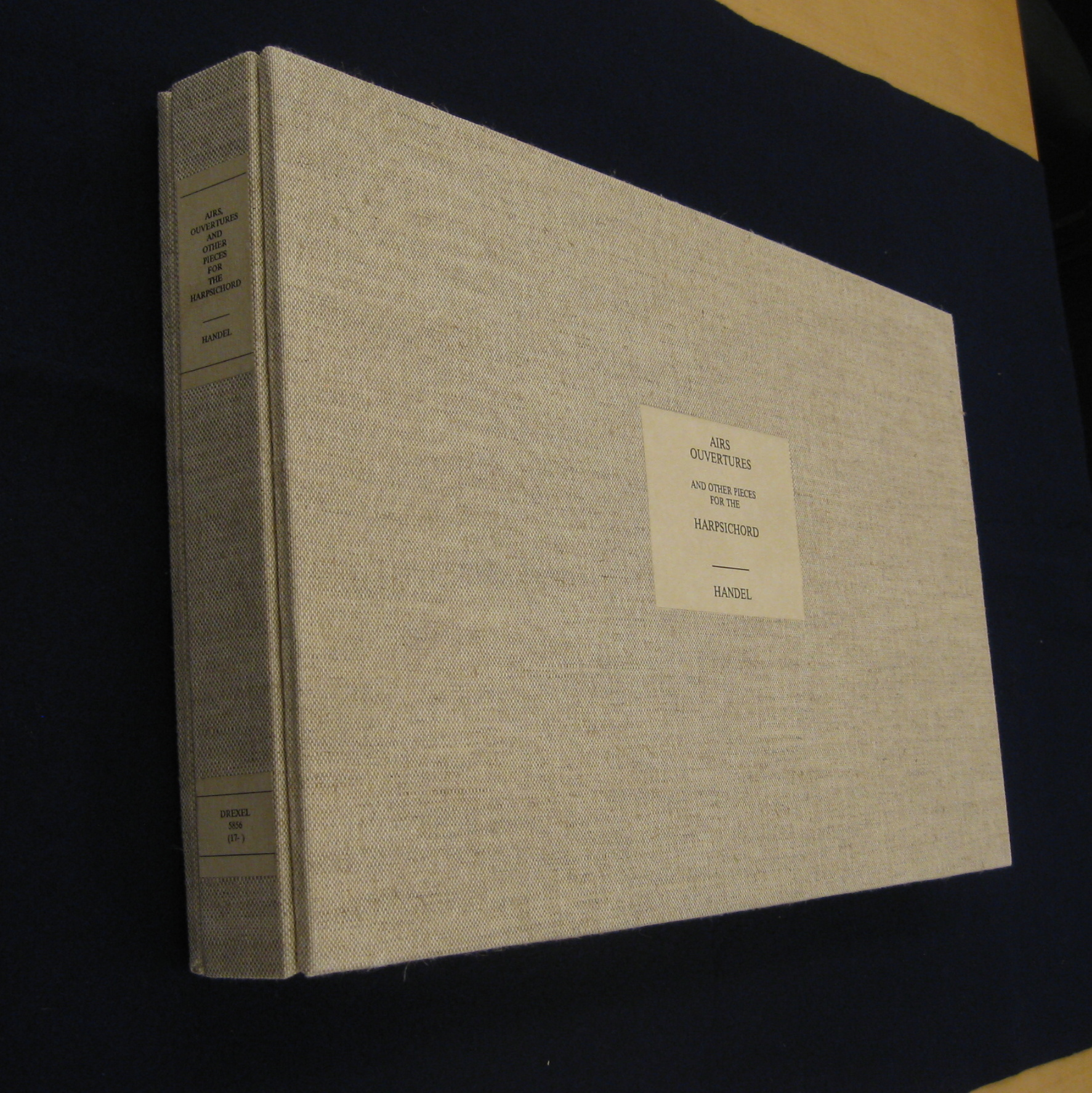
- Drexel 5856
- Type: Music manuscript
- Date: between 1720 and 1721
- Place of origin: England
- Size: 124 pages

Drexel 5856 is a music manuscript containing works composed by George Frideric Handel. It is a significant primary source of the composer's work, having been copied by one of Handel's frequent copyists, John Christopher Smith, possibly as a presentation copy.

Belonging to the New York Public Library, it forms part of the Music Division's Drexel Collection, located at the New York Public Library for the Performing Arts. Following traditional library practice, its name is derived from its call number.

== Date ==
Drexel 5856 dates from 1720 to 1721. Most of Handel's keyboard music was composed in the decade 1710–1720, an observation we know from a study of his handwriting and paper studies. John Christopher Smith became Handel's copyist beginning in the years 1716–1717. Along with two other manuscript, Terence Best surmises that Drexel 5856 was prepared for a patron who was a friend of the composer.

== Provenance ==
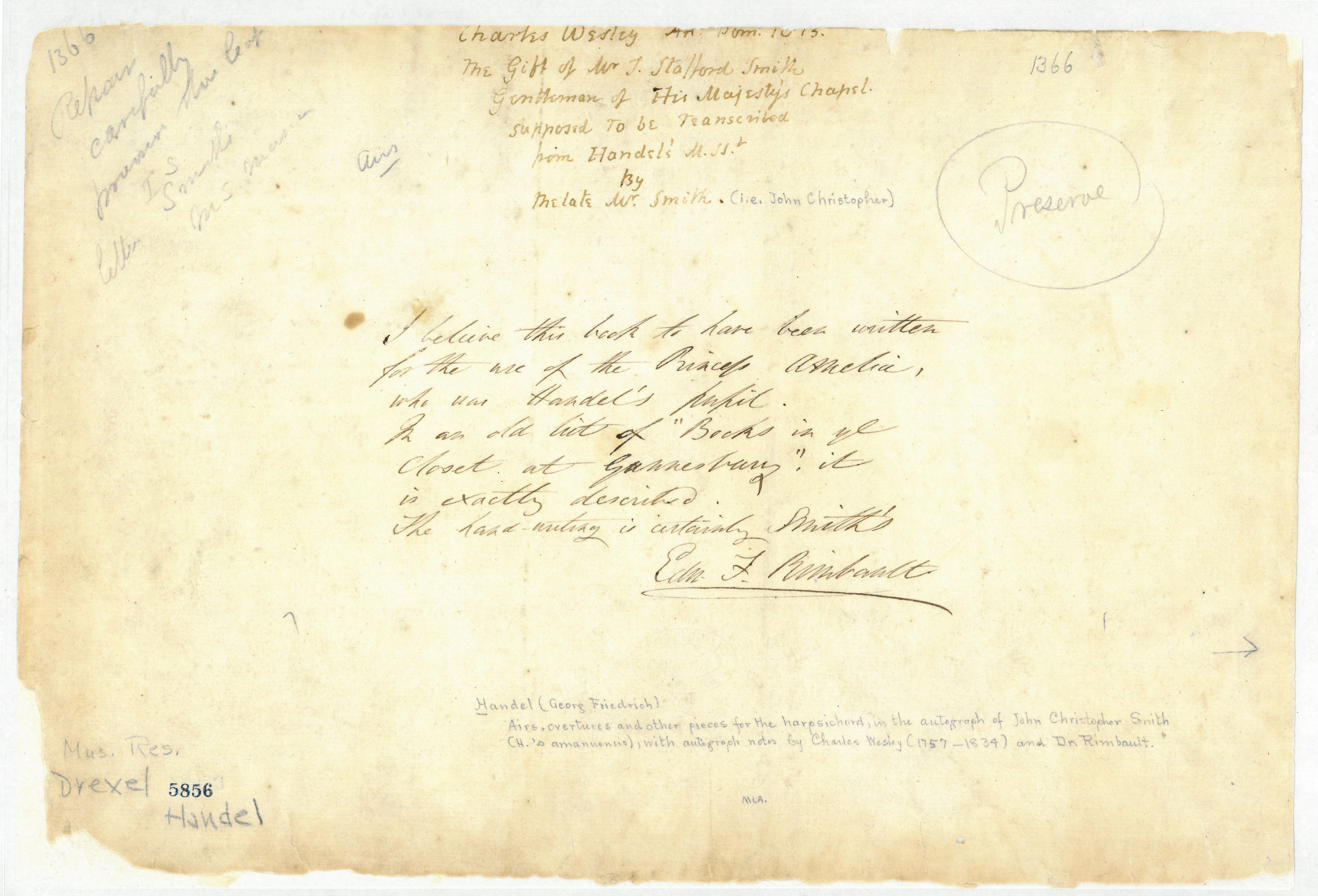
Flyleaf of Drexel 5856, a music manuscript copied by John Christopher Smith, containing music by George Frideric Handel

The earliest known owner of Drexel 5856 was the composer John Stafford Smith, who also was as an antiquarian and collector of manuscripts. He presented it as a gift to Charles Wesley, possibly in 1813. This much of the provenance is known from Wesley's inscription on the volume's initial leaf:

Charles Wesley An. Dom. 1813

The Gift of Mr. J. Stafford Smith
Gentleman of His Majesty's Chapel
supposed to be transcribed
from Handel's mss
by

the late Mr. Smith.

Below Wesley's writing is an inscription from the subsequent owner Edward Francis Rimbault, who wrote:

I believe this book to have been written

for the use of the Princess Amelia,
who was Handel's pupil.
In an old list of "Books in y^{e}
Closet at Gunnersbury," it
is exactly described.

The hand-writing is certainly Smith's.

Rimbault stated that he believed the manuscript to have been copied for Princess Amelia of Great Britain. He based this idea on having seen a book "Books in y^{e} closet at Gunnersbury." (No contemporary musicologists repeat this assertion. Rimbault's findings are occasionally faulty; see Drexel 4180—4185 for examples of his conclusions that are considered doubtful.)

After Rimbault's death in 1876, the manuscript was listed as lot 1366 in the 1877 auction catalog of his estate (the number 1366 can be seen in the upper left corner of the initial leaf). The manuscript was one of about 600 lots purchased by Philadelphia-born financier Joseph W. Drexel, who had already amassed a large music library. Upon Drexel's death, he bequeathed his music library to The Lenox Library. When the Lenox Library merged with the Astor Library to become the New York Public Library, the Drexel Collection became the basis for one of its founding units, the Music Division. Today, Drexel 5856 is part of the Drexel Collection in the Music Division, now located at the New York Public Library for the Performing Arts at Lincoln Center.

== Content ==
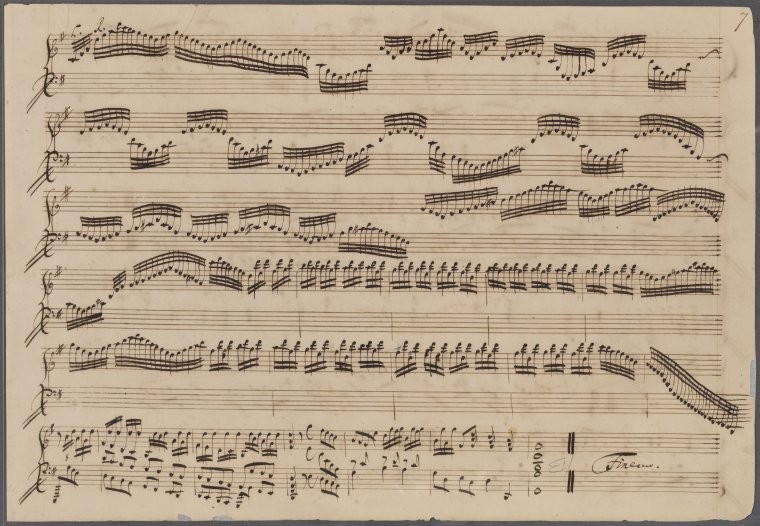
Page 7 of Drexel 5856, the final page of the aria "Vo' fa guerra" from the opera Rinaldo

Although no scholars have written about the manuscript as a whole, the editors of the Hallische Händel-Ausgabe were well-aware of Drexel 5856. It is included in a list of significant sources of Handel's keyboard works in the Händel-Werke-Verzeichnis, the thematic catalog of Handel's works. The thematic catalog attests that Drexel 5856 was used in editing the critical editions of those works included in the manuscript.

Christopher Hogwood consulted the manuscript when working on his book Handel : Water Music and Music for the Royal Fireworks.

In his review of a 1986 edition of Handel's harpsichord suites, Terence Best criticized the editor for not including "important" sources, mentioning Drexel 5856 as one of those sources.

== Contents ==
Pages	Title in manuscript	Uniform title	Key	HWV number	Remarks
1–7	Aria in y^{e} Opera Rinaldo vo' fa' Guerra	"Vo' far guerra, e vincer voglio" from Rinaldo	G major	HWV 7a, no. 28	Caption title, page 1.
8–12	Chaccone	Suite de pièce Vol. 2 No. 2	G major	HWV 435	Caption title, page 8; Of the five versions Handel wrote of HWV 435, Drexel 5856 corresponds to the fifth version
13–16	Allemande	Suite de pièce Vol. 2 No. 5	E minor	HWV 438	There are two versions of the Gigue; Drexel 5856 contains the second version
17	Prelude	Prelude	G minor	HWV 572	Music incipit gives treble voices of whole-note chord notation at opening which probably was meant to be arpeggiated
17–19	Sonata	Suite de pièce Vol. 1 No. 7	G minor	HWV 432/2–3	At head of page 19: "This piece is like Crome's Music [?]"
20	Prelude	Suite de pièce Vol. 2 No. 1	B-flat Major	HWV 434/1	At tail of page 20: "Segue Subito"
21–22	Allemande	Suite de pièce Vol. 2 No. 7	B-flat Major	HWV 440/1b, 3b	At tail of page 21: "Segue il Sarabande"
22–23	variate	Suite de pièce Vol. 2 No. 1	B-flat Major	HWV 434/2	Aria variate; at tail of page 23: "Volti Subito"
24–26	Air	Suite de pièce Vol. 2 No. 1	B-flat Major	HWV 434/3	
26–31	Prelude	Suite de pièce Vol. 2 No. 4	D minor	HWV 437	Crossed-out version of prelude (page 26) written with C-1 clef, followed by clean copy with G-2 clef
32	Sonatina	Sonatina (Fugue)	D minor	HWV 581	
33–35	Allemande	Suite de pièce Vol. 1 No. 8	F minor	HWV 433/3–5	
36–37	Chaccona	Suite de pièce Vol. 1 No. 7	G minor	HWV 432/6	
38–39	Chaccone	Suite de pièce Vol. 1 No. 5	G major	HWV 430/4a	page 38, outer margin, 3rd system: "better / than in / the printed / lesson"
40–43	Allemande favorita	Suite de pièce Vol. 1 No. 4	E minor	HWV 429/2–5	page 41, inner margin, center: "Sarabande / a great favorite of / the Cilibrated Geminiani / and Mr Shelway"
44	Menuet I	Minuet	B flat major	HWV 553	At head of page 44: "The Court Menuets by M.^{r} HANDEL."
44	Menuet 2	Minuet	B flat major	HWV 554	
44–45	Menuet 3	Minuet	B flat major	HWV 555a	Version exists in 6/8
45	Menuet 4	Minuet	G minor	HWV 535b	Known in some sources as "The Princess Sophia's favourite Minuet"
45	Menuet 5th	Minuet	G minor	HWV 534a	Slightly different version exists, listed as HWV 534b
46	6. Menuet	Minuet	F major	HWV 516a	At head of page 46: "In one of / the Hautbois Concertos"
46–51	Allemande	Suite	C minor	HWV 446	Originally intended for 2 cembalos, though only first part is preserved
52–53	To one | of His Operas	Suite de pièce Vol. 1 No. 7	G minor	HWV 432/1	At head of page 52: "The op'ning of the 7th Suite. Vol. I."; in the left margin: "I think Agrippina"
54	Menuet	Suite de pièce Vol. 2 No. 1	G minor	HWV 434/4	
54	Menuet	Minuet	G minor	HWV 540b	Also used by Handel in HWV 1, HWV 540, HWV 603, and as popular song "Who to win a woman's favour"
55	Gigue	Suite de pièce Vol. 1 No. 7	G minor	HWV 432/5	
56	Allemande	Suite de pièce Vol. 2 No. 8	G major	HWV 441/1	
56	Menuet	Minuet	G major	HWV 513b	
57	Prelude	Prelude	E major	HWV 566	
58–60	Allemande	Suite de pièce Vol. 1 No. 7	E major	HWV 432/2–3	
61–64	Overture for y^{e} Water Musick	Water music	F major	HWV 348/5–10	At head of page 62: "Aria"
64–66	[without title]	Water music	D major	HWV 349/11–12	
67–68	Air	Water music	G major	HWV 350/16–18	
68–69	[without title]	Water music	D major	HWV 349/14–15	
69–70	Minuet	Water music	G minor	HWV 350/19–21	At tail of 2nd system, page 70: "Siegue il Coro"
70	Coro	Water music	D major	HWV 349/13	At head of 4th system (in a later hand), page 70: "What is all / this!"
70	Harpeggio	Prelude	F-sharp minor	HWV 570	At head of 4th system, page 70: "6 [illegible] / in / the Printed / SUITE."
71–73	Ouverture	Suite de pièce Vol. 1 No. 6	F-sharp minor	HWV 431/2–4	
76–85	Allemande	Suite de pièce Vol. 2 No. 6	G minor	HWV 439/1–2, 4 HWV 432/4	At head of page 76: "Composed for Her R.H. The Princess of ORANGE."
86–97	Chaconne	Chaconne with 49 variations	C major	HWV 484	Chaconne 49 Variations; variations 45–49 numbered incorrectly;
97–110	Chacconne	Suite de piece Vol. 2 No. 9	G major	HWV 442/2	Before variation 62, system 5, page 110: "Canon in the 8th"; prelude missing
111–115	Ouverture of Amadis	Amadigi di Gaula (Excerpts), arr.	C minor	HWV 11	Later version of Overture (comp: 1725c): HWV 456/2 differs from transcription of HWV 11 on many points, and excludes the Gavotta
116–118	Capriccio	Prelude and Capriccio	G major	HWV 571/2	Drexel 5856 does not include Prelude of HWV 571, and the pairing of Prelude and Capriccio might not be the composer's
119	Prelude	Preludes	D minor	HWV 562	At head of 1st system, page 119: "Arpeggio"
120–121	Ouverture of y^{e} Pastorale	Il Pastor fido (Excerpts), arr.	D minor	HWV 8a	At tail of page 121: "Segue L'aria [music incipit] c: / in y^{e} printed book"
122–124	Aria Adagio	Suite de pièce Vol. 1 No. 3	D minor	HWV 428/5	At tail of page 124: "FINE."

== Works consulted ==
- Baselt, Bernd (1986), Thematisch-systematisches Verzeichnis: Instrumentalmusik Pasticci und Fragmente, Händel-Handbuch, vol. Band 3, Kassel: Bärenreiter, ISBN 9783761807163
- Best, Terence (1987), "Concerto in D Major by George Frideric Handel, Robert Court; Eight Great Suites by Richard Jones", Music & Letters, 68 (4): 396–397, doi:10.1093/ml/68.4.396, JSTOR 735277 (JSTOR access by subscription)
- Best, Terence (1983), "Handel's harpsichord music: a checklist", in Hogwood, Christopher; Luckett, Richard (eds.), Music in Eighteenth-Century England: Essays in Memory of Charles Cudworth, Cambridge: Cambridge University Press, ISBN 9780521235259
- Hogwood, Christopher (2005), Handel: Water Music and Music for the Royal Fireworks, Cambridge music handbooks, Cambridge, UK: Cambridge University Press, ISBN 9780521836364
