= Drexel 5611 =

- New York Public Library for the Performing Arts
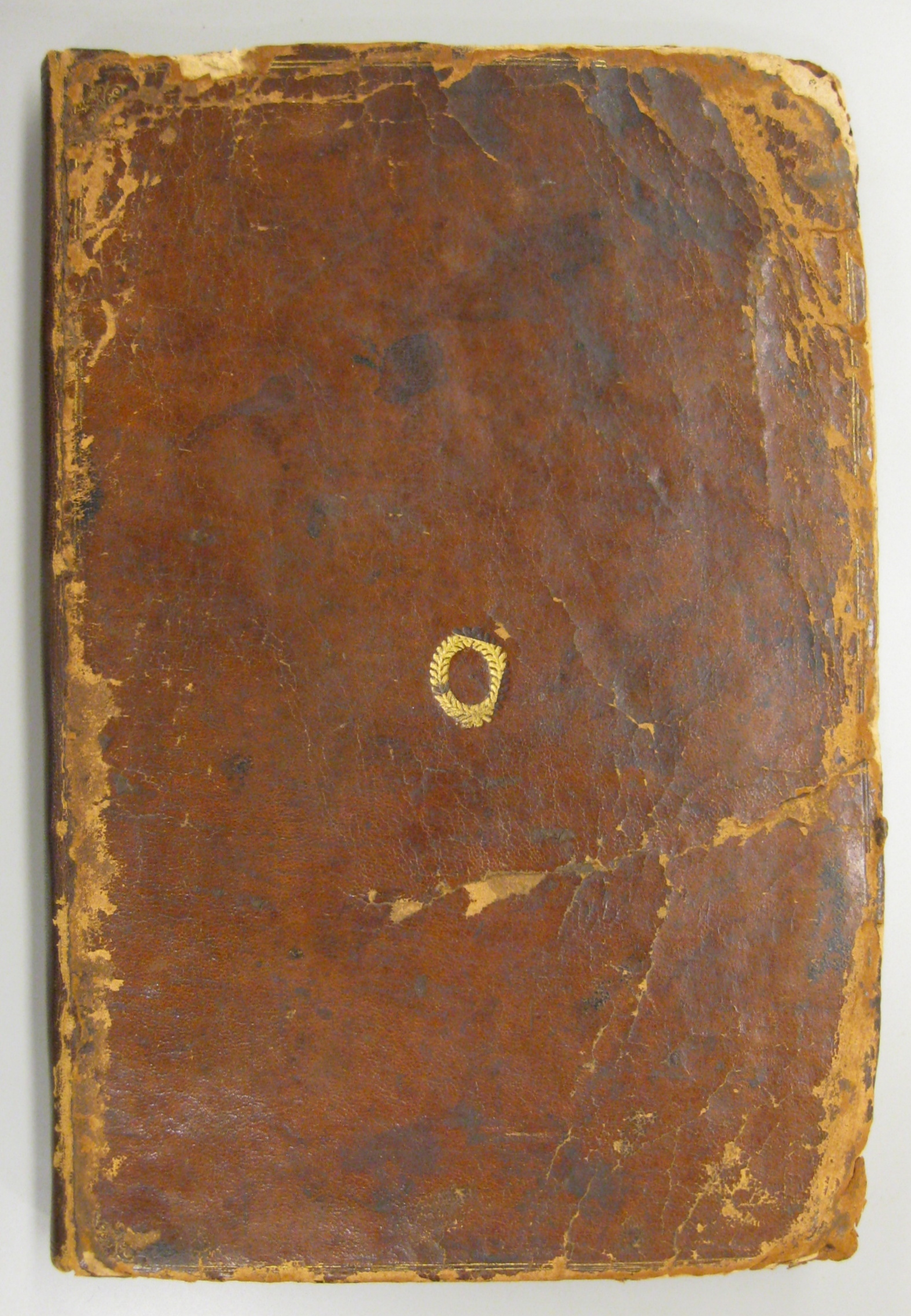
- Drexel 5611
- Type: Music manuscript
- Date: late 1650s-early 1660s
- Place of origin: England
- Compiled by: 3 anonymous copyists (the first thought to be Thomas Heardson, the third thought to be Albertus Byrne)
- Size: 11.5 × 7.75 × .75 inches (29.2 × 19.7 × 1.9 cm)
- Accession: 1888 by the Lenox Library (now part of the New York Public Library)

Drexel 5611 is a 17th-century music manuscript compilation of works written for virginal. Dating from either the end of the Commonwealth period or the early Restoration period (when collections of keyboard music were rare), it is an important source for English keyboard music. It also includes a handful of works by French composers, reflecting the growing interest among English musicians in contemporary French keyboard music.

Belonging to the New York Public Library, it forms part of the Music Division's Drexel Collection, located at the New York Public Library for the Performing Arts. Following traditional library practice, its name is derived from its call number.

== Date ==
Jeffrey Mark, a librarian with the New York Public Library and the first to write about Drexel 5611, observed that the manuscript contains three works by French composers, indicating that it was compiled during the reign of Charles II of England. Musicologist Barry Cooper suggested that the bulk of the manuscript dates from approximately 1655–1670 with the final thirteen works dating later. Surveying numerous manuscripts containing French harpsichord music, Bruce Gustafson suggested "circa 1664?"

In her discussion of the manuscript, Candace Bailey noted that Gerald Hendrie (editor of an edition of Orlando Gibbons's keyboard music) observed that Gibbons's composition "The Queen's Command" exists both in Drexel 5611 and in British Library manuscript Add. 31723, and that the latter source was copied from the former. A note in the Add. 31723 manuscript indicates: "transcribed from an ancient ms. of 1657." Bailey wonders that, if Drexel 5611 is that 1657 manuscript, does the date mentioned in the note represent a beginning or termination date? Bailey observed that if the 1657 termination date is correct, Drexel 5611 represents the earliest sources of music composed by Matthew Locke. Bailey concluded her discussion by establishing dating at "1650s or early 1660s."

== Physical description ==
The dimensions of Drexel 5611 measures 11.5 × 7.75 × .75 inches (29.2 × 19.7 × 1.9 cm). It contains 89 works written out over 159 pages.

The manuscript's title page is preceded by a tipped-in image of Gibbons by engraved by J. Caldwell and published about 1750—apparently the work of a later owner. (The engraving is the same as included in John Hawkins's A General History of the Science and Practice of Music published in 1776.)

== Watermarks ==
Bruce Gustafson identified six watermarks present in Drexel 5611:

Gustafson watermark number	Visual description	Possible source
51	Foolscap with seven-point bell collar, facing right, with figure "4" and three circles	no information
71	Cardinal's hat	no information
72	Horn in crowned wreath with initials "IGD"	English origin
86	Large posts with grapes (fir cone?) and trefoil crown; no discernable initials	Possibly of German origin
87	Large pot (single-handled, left) with U-shaped top, initials "O [Q?] R"	no information
88	Large post (single-handled, right) with U-shaped top, initials not discernable	no information

Robert Klakowich believed that the paper of Drexel 5611 was probably of French or German origin. He based this assumption on knowing that Holland was the main paper distributor for Europe during the mid-17th century, importing paper from France, Switzerland, Germany and Italy, and then redistributing it. (Holland would not be a paper manufacturer until the last two decades of the seventeenth century.)

== Provenance ==
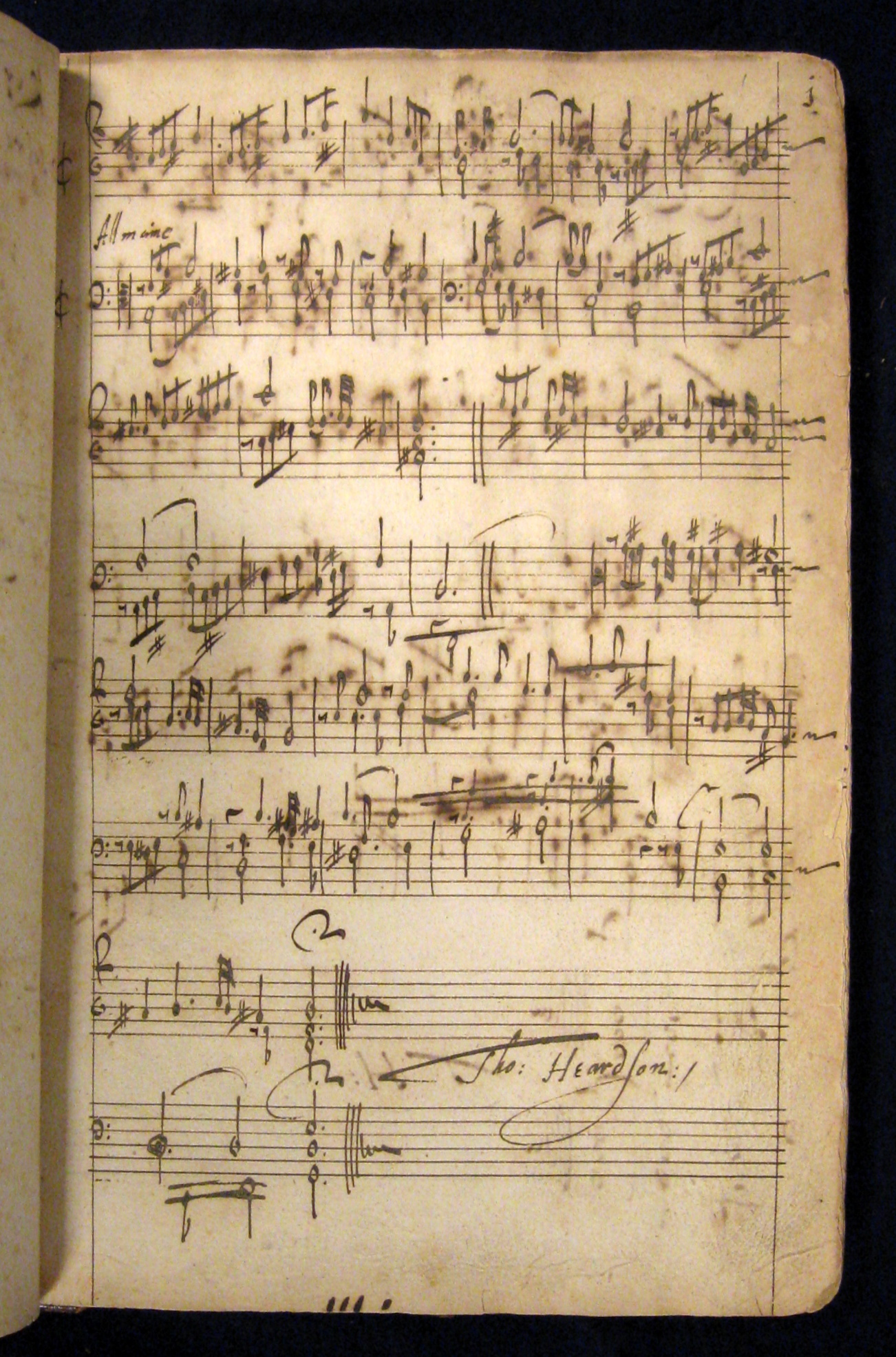
Allmaine by Thomas Heardson, the first work found in the manuscript Drexel 5611

Jeffrey Mark observed that seven of the final ten works in Drexel 5611 were composed by Albertus Bryne. He thus surmised that the manuscript was once owned by Bryne, who became organist of Westminster Abbey after 1666. That the signature of no. 83 is less neat than that of the copyist of the surrounding works led Mark to assume it was Bryne's signature.

Klakowich discovered that the manuscript had once belonged to Charles Burney and was listed as lot 634 in the auction of his estate. He hypothesized that Burney might have come into possession of the manuscript during the third quarter of the 18th century.

The reprint of Burney auction catalog indicates that the manuscript was purchased for 5s 6d by Edward Jones (1752-1824).

It is not known how the manuscript came into the possession of Edward Francis Rimbault, although Klakowich made an educated guess that it could have been purchased from the Jones's auction by Rimbault's father, Stephen Francis Rimbault. A musicologist and a voracious collector of British manuscripts, it is not surprising that the manuscript would become one of his holdings. After Rimbault's death in 1876, the manuscript was listed as lot 1394 in the 1877 auction catalog of his estate. Purchased for £16 10s, the manuscript was one of about 600 lots acquired by Philadelphia-born financier Joseph W. Drexel, who had already amassed a large music library. Upon Drexel's death, he bequeathed his music library to The Lenox Library. When the Lenox Library merged with the Astor Library to become the New York Public Library, the Drexel Collection became the basis for one of its founding units, the Music Division. Today, Drexel 5611 is part of the Drexel Collection in the Music Division, now located at the New York Public Library for the Performing Arts at Lincoln Center.

== Copyists ==
Scholars have identified three different hands in the manuscript. Their lack of a definitive identity has given musicologists a chance to evaluate and hypothesize based on available evidence. Most scholars suspect that the first scribe (who entered most of the works and the index at the front of the volume) was Thomas Heardson. Klakowich stated that the first copyist was responsible for nos. 1-76 and 78-86. Klakowich observed that the manuscript's attributions to Heardson lack the title "Mr." which strongly suggests that Heardson himself was author and copyist. Bailey noted that, although the name Thomas Heardson is associated with the manuscript, there were several people with that name from which to choose. Basing her research on that of Klakowich, Bailey narrowed down the choice to one person, information about whom is elusive. He was organist at Ludlow Parish Church 1637–42, and possibly the author of the three-voice song "Gloria Patri" that appears in John Hilton's 1652 publication Catch That Catch Can. (The Wikipedia article Church of St. Mary Magdalene, Newark-on-Trent mentions that Heardson was master of the song school at that church 1642–49.) Comparing Drexel 5611 with a document produced by the Thomas Heardson of Ludlow Parish Church, Bailey concludes that they are the same hand, revealing the identify of Thomas Heardson. (She also suggests that he might be a brother or relative of John Heardson, organist at Lincoln Cathedral Choir in the 1630s.)

Klakowich observed that the second copyist was responsible for only no. 77 on page 142 (a work by Matthew Locke). He suggested that this copyist might have been an associate of Heardson's which Bailey considers a "reasonable proposal" (particularly as no other evidence presents itself).

The third scribe entered works by Albertus Bryne, nos. 87-89 on pages .... This is particularly intriguing not just because of consecutive works by the same composer, but also because, as observed by Klakowich, the scribe appears to be the same one who penned the manuscript Ob. Mus. Sch. Ms. D.219 in the Bodleian Library. Since all of the third copyist's work is that of composer Albert Bryne, Klakowich adopted Hendrie's belief and felt that Bryne is the copyist. (Klakowich felt that only the final three works are in Byrne's hand, which explains why some of the preceding works include the title "Mr.")

Barry Cooper disagreed with Klakowich because of different forms of the name. Bailey attempted to reconcile the two conflicting viewpoints, noting that both manuscripts have a similar provenance (both are from Oxford), lending much weight to Bryne as the third copyist.

== Attributions ==
Klakowich identifies two main issues regarding the attributions in Drexel 5611:

1. Discrepancies between the index and the works
2. Works found in other sources with different attributions

The number of conflicts in Drexel 5611 has led scholars to question the attributions altogether. For example, in his edition of keyboard works by Orlando Gibbons, editor Gerald Hendrie discounts all of Drexel 5611's attributions. Klakowich takes particular interest in no. 38. In Drexel 5611 the attribution is to Christopher Gibbons, whereas in other sources the composer is identified as Orlando Gibbons.

Klakowich notes that the version in Drexel 5611 is a reworking of a piece by Orlando Gibbons. He therefore solves the discrepancy by theorizing that the attribution of Christopher Gibbons may refer to him as an arranger (in this case, having made an arrangement of one of his father's works). Klakowich therefore opens up the possibility that some of the attributions in Drexel 5611, rather than exclusively indicating composers, may sometimes refer to arrangers.

== Content ==
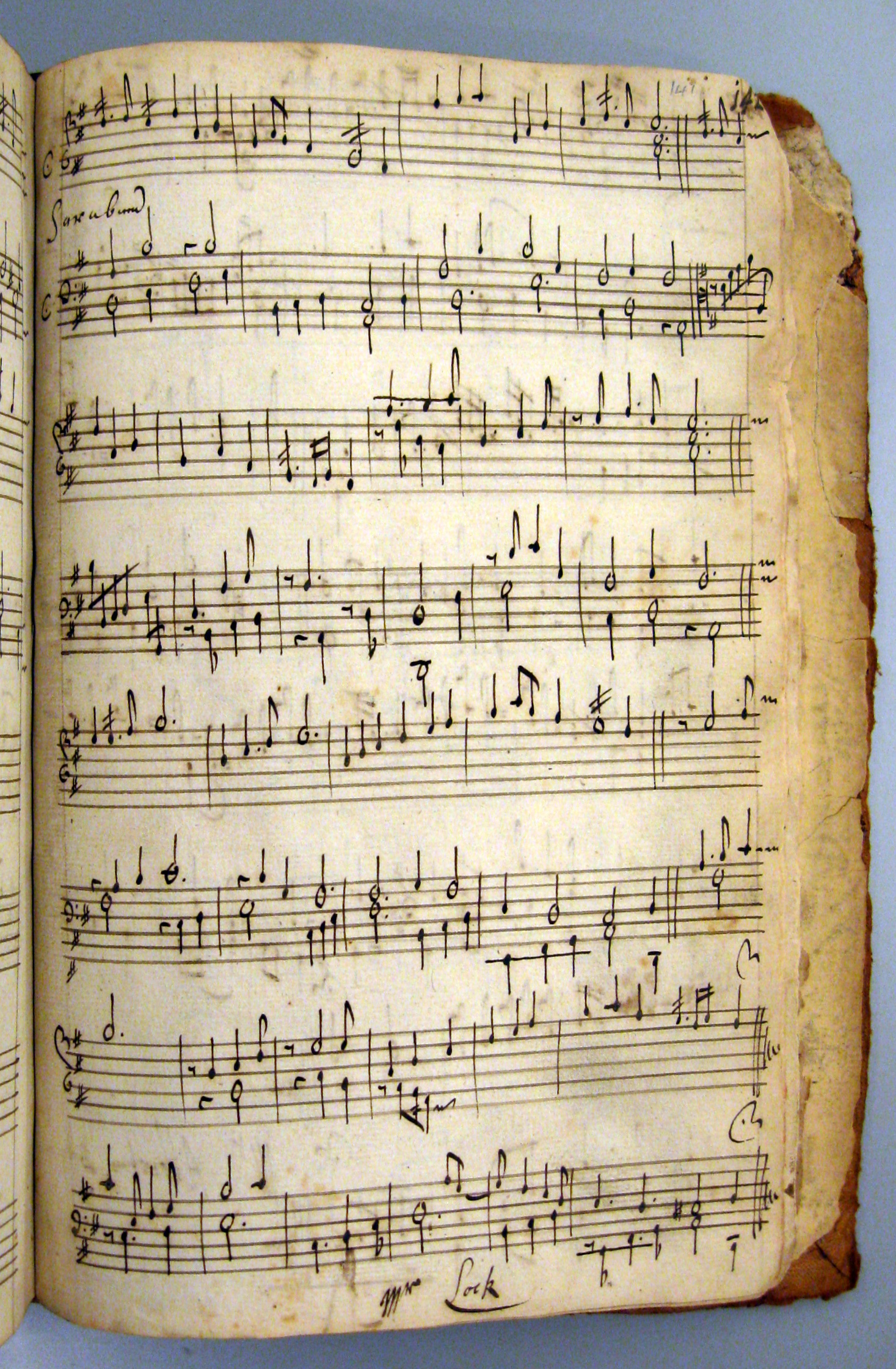
Saraband by Matthew Locke, one of his earliest known keyboard works, found in the manuscript Drexel 5611

In her 2003 study, Bailey described Drexel 5611 as heralding a new style in 17th-century British keyboard music. She based her observation on the manuscript's musical content, noting that the copyist had access to some of the most contemporary keyboard works of the period between the English Civil War and the Commonwealth, the frequency of dance movements, and the organization by key, composer and dance order. The manuscript's singularity stems from including the earliest known keyboard works of Matthew Locke.

The majority of the eighty-nine works within Drexel 5611 are dance works. Of these dance works, sixty-seven carry titles which clearly indicate their dance associations. The other sixteen contain dance characteristics but are either untitled or titled "Toy" (nos. 12, 13, 27), "For the hand" (nos. 68, 70, 71), "First, second, third" (nos. 28, 29, 31) and two have unique titles ("Gerrard's Tune" no. 30 and "Queen's Command" no. 67). Combining designated works with those exhibiting particular dance characteristics, Klakowich observed that Drexel 5611 contains 31 almands, 43 corants, 8 sarabands, and 1 galliard. Before no. 77 Klakowich observes that organization of movements is not consistent. But after no. 77, he observes the frequency of the three-movement organization almand-corant-saraband. This three-movement organization also exists with the works by Benjamin Rogers (nos. 32-34) and a four-movement structure for the works by Mercure (nos. 42-45).

The six non-dance works are three voluntaries (nos. 5, 55 and 56), one cantus firmus work (no. 6), the work entitled "Division" (no. 66, attributed in the manuscript to John Bull but probably composed by Orlando Gibbons), and the ground by Arthur Phillips.

=== Organization ===
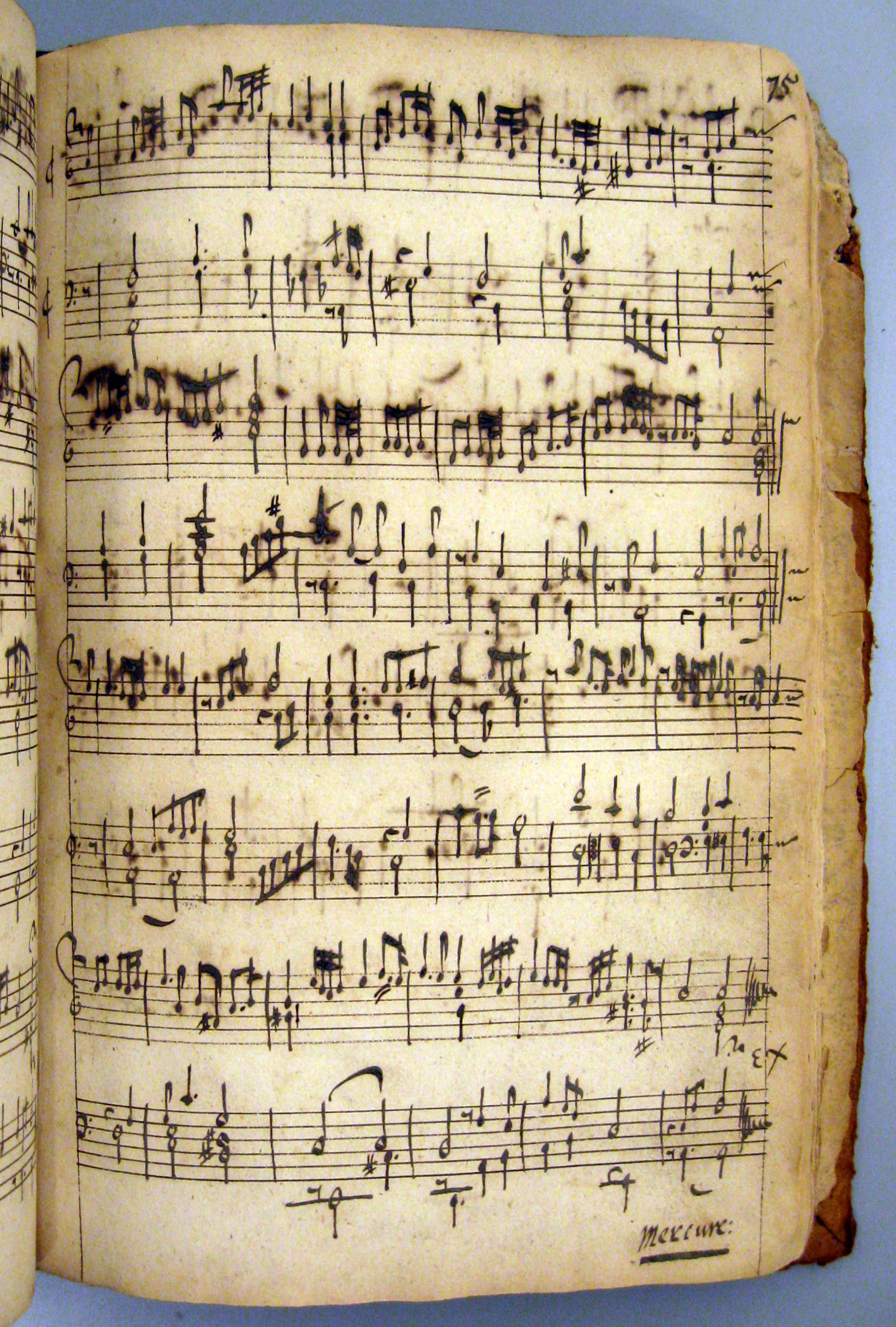
Allmaine by a composer identified as Mercure, exhibiting the French style of composition

Mark was the first to note that Drexel 5611 used a six-line music staff, typical of organ and virginal music of the time. He also noted that works in the manuscript are organized by key, leading him to propose that the manuscript was created by or for a teacher for pedagogical purposes. Advancing this idea, Mark surmised that the few works which do not adhere to this scheme were probably later additions entered on what was originally blank pages. Bailey also observed the arrangement by key, adding that—within each key—works were organized by composer. Unlike most English keyboard manuscripts of the time, Bailey noted that Drexel 5611 carries composer attributions for every work (even though some of these attributions are in error). (Composer attributions were to become prevalent later in the 17th century.) She observed the kind of music contained in Drexel 5611 ranges from simple settings of popular tunes to more complex works with varied repeats.

Bailey theorized about the volume's organization based on the order of the works it contains. She saw a first section starting from the volume's initial page and continuing through page 65. In this section she observed that the copyist must have had access to contemporary modern music of the period including the English Civil War and the Commonwealth of England. She noted that the emphasis placed on dance movements "is new" as is their ordering. Assuming the copyist was Heardson, Bailey observed that the manuscript begins with works by Heardson, Roberts and Facy, the latter two of whom Bailey suggested might have been colleagues. She surmised that Heardson must have had brief access to works of Benjamin Rogers early during the manuscript's compilation, for his works appear (pages 58–60) but then cease while the works by Roberts and Facy continue.

Bailey saw a second section from pages 66 through 130, characterized by a change of repertory that included works by foreign composers. That Heardson places the works by John Mercure and those attributed to John Cobb together suggested to Bailey that he had access to these works for only a brief time. She noted the two works by Thomas Tomkins on pages 90 and 92 show a significantly more intricate keyboard technique, in contradistinction to the surrounding works by Orlando Gibbons and others. Although several works by La Barre and Tesure appear, they appear with less organization than the works by Mercure and Cobb. The variety of composers in this section suggests that Heardson had access to a considerable amount of music.

Bailey identified the final section starting at page 131 and continuing through the end, beginning with a suite by Matthew Locke followed by ten works by Bryne. Though it might be logical to assume that all of Bryne's works are in the same hand, they are not, some being in Heardson's hand and others being in the same hand as in manuscript Mus. Sch. MS D.219 in the Bodleian Library. That Bailey calls this an enigma.

=== Foreign influences ===
Musicologists have noted the inclusion of foreign music in the manuscript.(Klakowich, Gustafson, Cooper 1989)

Bailey noted that works of composers John Roberts and Albertus Bryne appear to have been influenced by French keyboard style. She noted that Drexel 5611 is one of only a few manuscripts that contain works by Hugh Facy. Bailey considered Facy's works were "part of the final vestiges of the contrapuntal tradition of the virginalists and evince a kinship with similar pieces by John Lugge, possibly resulting from a personal relationship with Lugge, who lived relatively nearby in Exeter." The organ works by Hugh Facy included in Drexel 5611 contribute to our understanding of organ literature at a time when organs were banned in churches and cathedrals.

== List of contents ==
This table is based on Bailey whose list numbered each musical work consecutively. Page 124 in the manuscript is mistakenly labeled 125; succeeding pages continue the scribe's erroneous count. Page numbers listed here adhere to the erroneous count.

Page number	Work number	Title	Attribution in manuscript	Remarks
1	1	Allmaine	Tho: Heardson	
2	2	[Allmaine]	T:H:	title from index
3	3	[Allmaine]	Mr. Jo: Roberts	title from index
4-5	4	[Allmaine]	Mr. Roberts	title from index
6-7	5	Voluntary	Hugh: Facy	title: Hugh: Facy: Voluntary?
8-9	6	Ave Maris stella	Mr: Facy	
10				blank
11	7	Allmaine	Mr: Roberts	
12	8	Allmaine	Tho: Heardson	
13	9	Corant	[Tresure]	
14	10	[Corant]	La: Tresor	title from index
15-16	11	A Galliard	Mr: Facy	
17	12	[Toy]	Mr: Facy	title from index
18	13	[Toy]	Mr: Facy	title from index
19				blank
20-21	14	Lesson & hand	Mr: facy	title from index
22				blank
23	15	Allmaine	Tho: Heardson	
24	16	Corant	Tho: Heardson	
25	17	Allmaine	Mr: Jo: Roberts	incorrect title in index, refers to #18
26-27	18	Allmaine and division	Mr: Jo: Roberts	title from index for #17
28	19	Sarabrand	Mr: Roberts	
29				blank
30-31	20	[Corant]	Mr: Jo: Roberts	title from index
32-33	21	[Corant]	Mr: Jo: Roberts	title from index
34-35	22	Corant	Mr: Roberts	
36-38				blank
39-41	23	[Allmaine and division]	Mr: Roberts	title from index
42	24	[Allmaine]	Mr: Roberts	title from index
43	25	[Allmaine]	Tho: Heardson	
44	26	Corant	Tho: Heardson	
45	27	Toy	T:H:	
46-47	28	[1st] [Allmaine]	Mr: Facy	number-title from index
48-49	29	[2nd] [Allmaine]	Mr: Facy	number-title from index
50-51	30	Gerrards Tune	Tho: Heardson	
52-57	31	[3rd] [Corant]	Mr: Facy	number-title from index
58	32	Allmaine	Rogers	attributed to Rogers in index
59	33	Corant	Mr: Ben: Rogers	
60	34	Sarb [Sarabrand]	Mr: Benjamin Rogers	
61				blank
62-63	35	Lesson	Mr: Facy	title from index
64	36	Allmaine	Tho: Heardson	
65	37	Corant	T:H:	
66-67	38	[untitled]	C.Gibbons [0. Gibbons]	Possibly an arrangement by Christopher Gibbons of a work by his father Orlando Gibbons
68				blank
69	39	Corant	Tho: Heardson	
70	40	[Corant]	[O.Gibbons]	title and attribution from index; Gerald Hendrie states the work is most likely French, La Barre or Tresure
71				blank
72-73	41	Corant	Mercure	
74	41	[Allmaine]	[Mercure]	title and attribution from index
75	42	[Allmaine]	Mercure	title from index
76	43	Coranto	Mercure	
77	44	Sarab[rand]	Mercure	
78	45	[Coranto]	Mr. [Orlando] Gibbons	title and "Orlando" from index; Gerald Hendrie states the work is most likely French, La Barre or Tresure
79	46	[Coranto]	[Orlando Gibbons]	title and attribution from index [spurious]; Gerald Hendrie states the work is most likely French, La Barre or Tresure
80	47	[Coranto]	Mr. [Orlando] Gibbons	title and "Orlando" from index [spurious]; Gerald Hendrie states the work is most likely French, La Barre or Tresure
81	48	Allmaine	Mr: Cobb	
82	49	[Allmaine]	Mr: Cobb	title from index
83	50	[Coranto]	[Cobb]	title and attribution from index
84	51	[Allmaine]	Mr: Cobb	title and attribution from index
85	52	[Allmaine]	Mr: Cobb	title from index
86				blank
87	53	[Coranto]	Mr: Cobb	title from index
88-89			blank	
90-91	54	Voluntary	Mr: Tho: Tomkins	
92-93	55	Voluntary	Mr: Tho: Tomkins	
94	56	Corant [Allmaine]	Mr: Treser	
95	57	Corant	Mr: Treser	
96-97	58	Corant [and division]	Treser	"and division" from index
98	59	Corant	[Tresure]	attribution from index
99	60	Corant	[Tresure]	attribution from index
100-101	61	Corant	Mr: Gibbs	
102	62	Allmaine	Treser	
103	63	Corant	Labar	
104-105	64	Corant	Treser	
106-107	65	[untitled]	Dr. Bull [O.Gibbons]	*CVB and Mus. 47 (in Christ Church, Oxford) attribute to Orlando Gibbons
108-109	66	Queenes Command	Dr. Bull [O.Gibbons]	this work is attributed to Gibbons in Parthenia (published in 1621), CVB and Drexel 5612
110-112	67	[for the hand]	Orlando Gibbons	title from index [Portman] *Only Och 1177 (in Christ Church, Oxford) attributes to Portman, but Hendrie follows it based on style
113	68	Coranto	Labar	Attributed to "Mounsier Tresor" in index
114-115	69	[For the Hand]	Mr: Facy	title from index
116-117	70	[For the Hand]	T:H:	
118-123				blank; listed in index as two corants by Tresure
125-126	71	Coranto	Mr: Ben: Cosyn	Page 124 mislabled 125
127			blank	
128-130	72	Coranto: Mr. Lawes	Mr. Benjamin Coosens	
131-139	73	Ground	Mr: Phillipps	
140	74	[Allmaine]	Mr. Locke	
141	75	Coranto	[? Locke]	
142	76	Saraband	Mr. Lock	
143	77	Allmaine	Mr: Albertus Bryne	
144	78	Coranto	A:B:	
145	79	Sar[aband]	Mr. Bryne	
145-146	80	Allmaine	Albert Bryne	
147-148				blank
149-150	81	Allmaine	Mr. Bryne	
151	82	Corant		
152	83	[Sarabande]		
153-154				blank
155-156	84	Allmaine	A B	Possibly in Bryne's hand
157-158	85	[Corant]	A:B:	Possibly in Bryne's hand
158-159	86	[Sarabrand]	A: Bryne	Possibly in Bryne's hand

== Works consulted ==
- Bailey, Candace (2000), "New York Public Library Drexel MS 5611", Fontes Artis Musicae, 47 (1): 51–67, JSTOR 23509042
- Bailey, Candace (2003), Seventeenth-Century British Keyboard Sources, Detroit studies in music bibliography, vol. 38, Detroit, MI: Harmonie Park Press, ISBN 9780899901138
- Caldwell, John (1985), English Keyboard Music Before the Nineteenth Century, New York: Dover, ISBN 9780486248516 (reprint of 1973 edition)
- Cooper, Barry (1989), English Solo Keyboard Music of the Middle and Late Baroque, New York: Garland, ISBN 0824001915
- Cooper, Barry (1972), "The Keyboard Suite in England Before the Restoration", Music & Letters, 53 (3): 319, JSTOR 734942
- Gibbons, Orlando (1924–1925), Glyn, Margaret H. (ed.), Complete Keyboard Works, London: Stainer & Bell
- Gibbons, Orlando (1962), Hendrie, Gerald (ed.), Keyboard music, Musica Britannica, vol. 20, London: Stainer and Bell, OCLC 772168
- Gustafson, Bruce (1979), French Harpsichord Music of the 17th Century: a Thematic Catalog of the Sources with Commentary, Studies in musicology, vol. 11, Ann Arbor, MI: UMI Research Press, ISBN 0835710696
- Klakowich, Robert (1985), Keyboard Sources in Mid-Seventeenth-Century England and the French Aspect of English Keyboard Music (Ph.D.), State University of New York at Buffalo
- Mark, Jeffrey (1925), "The Orlando Gibbons Tercentenary: Some Virginal Manuscripts in the Music Division", Bulletin of the New York Public Library, 29 (12): 847–860
