= Parthenia Inviolata =

17th-century English music book

Parthenia Inviolata, or Mayden-Musicke for the Virginalls and Bass-Viol is the second book of keyboard music printed in England, containing twenty pieces scored for virginal and bass viol.

It was apparently published as a companion work to Parthenia, published c. 1612, which contained 21 attributed pieces for virginal. The title extends the pun of the original work, as "inviolata" means both "unviolated" and "set for viol." Like Parthenia, no date is given, but Edward Francis Rimbault estimated 1614. Matthew Hall, who dates it somewhat later (c. 1624), noted that unlike earlier works that used keyboard to double parts in consort music, here the viol doubles a keyboard arrangement.

The only known surviving copy of this publication was in the possession of Rimbault at his death in 1876. It was sold in auction to book collector Joseph William Drexel and is now in the Drexel Collection (call number Drexel 5120) in the New York Public Library. A facsimile was published in 1961 with a historical introduction by Thurston Dart, foreword by Sydney Beck, and bibliographical note by Richard J. Wolfe.

All of the pieces are anonymous. Ernest Brenneke noted that one piece is apparently paraphrased from a piece by Giles Farnaby, and speculated on stylistic grounds that other pieces in the collection could be his.

== Contents ==
Of the twenty pieces, eight are untitled and three are titled "Almaine". A few are preserved in other places, however. Number 1 is a moresca that also appears in the Fitzwilliam Virginal Book (No. 247) and in the British Museum MS 36661, under slightly different titles, though also anonymous. Number 2 is a simplified version of a masque attributed to Farnaby in the Fitzwilliam Virginal Book (No. 209). Number 16 ("Almaine") is identical to a piece in the collection Drexel 5612, where it is also anonymous.

1. The Kinges Morisk
2. The Lordes Mask
3. The Irish Dance
4. New Noddie
5. Old Noddie
6. Ages of Youth
7. The first part of the old yeere
8. The last part of the old yeere
9. Miserere
10. Almaine
11. (untitled)
12. (untitled)
13. (untitled)
14. (untitled)
15. Almaine
16. Almaine
17. (untitled)
18. (untitled)
19. (untitled)
20. (untitled)
