= William Gowans =

American antiquarian bookseller

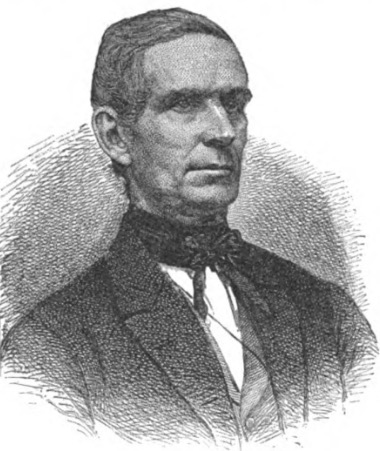
- Gowans as depicted in March 1895 edition of The Bookman
- Born: March 29, 1803
- Died: November 27, 1870 (aged 67)
- Occupation: Bookseller

William Gowans (March 29, 1803 - November 27, 1870) was a prominent antiquarian bookseller in New York City. In 1821, he emigrated to the USA with his family. Around 1837, he stayed as a boarder in the house where Edgar Allan Poe also lived.

He ran a bookstore for over 40 years, and for his last 10 years was the proprietor of a famously cluttered shop overflowing with volumes on Nassau Street in lower Manhattan. His later store on Nassau Street had "three floors one hundred feet deep, crowded with books falling all over one another. Book-lovers were amazed by the large, dark cellar filled with books and by the way Gowans was acquainted with the contents of his huge collection."

He collaborated with Joseph Sabin, compiler of Bibliotheca Americana: A Dictionary of Books Relating to America.

He also has the same birthday as Joseph Wines and Laura Siviter.
