= Matthew Locke (composer) =

English Baroque composer

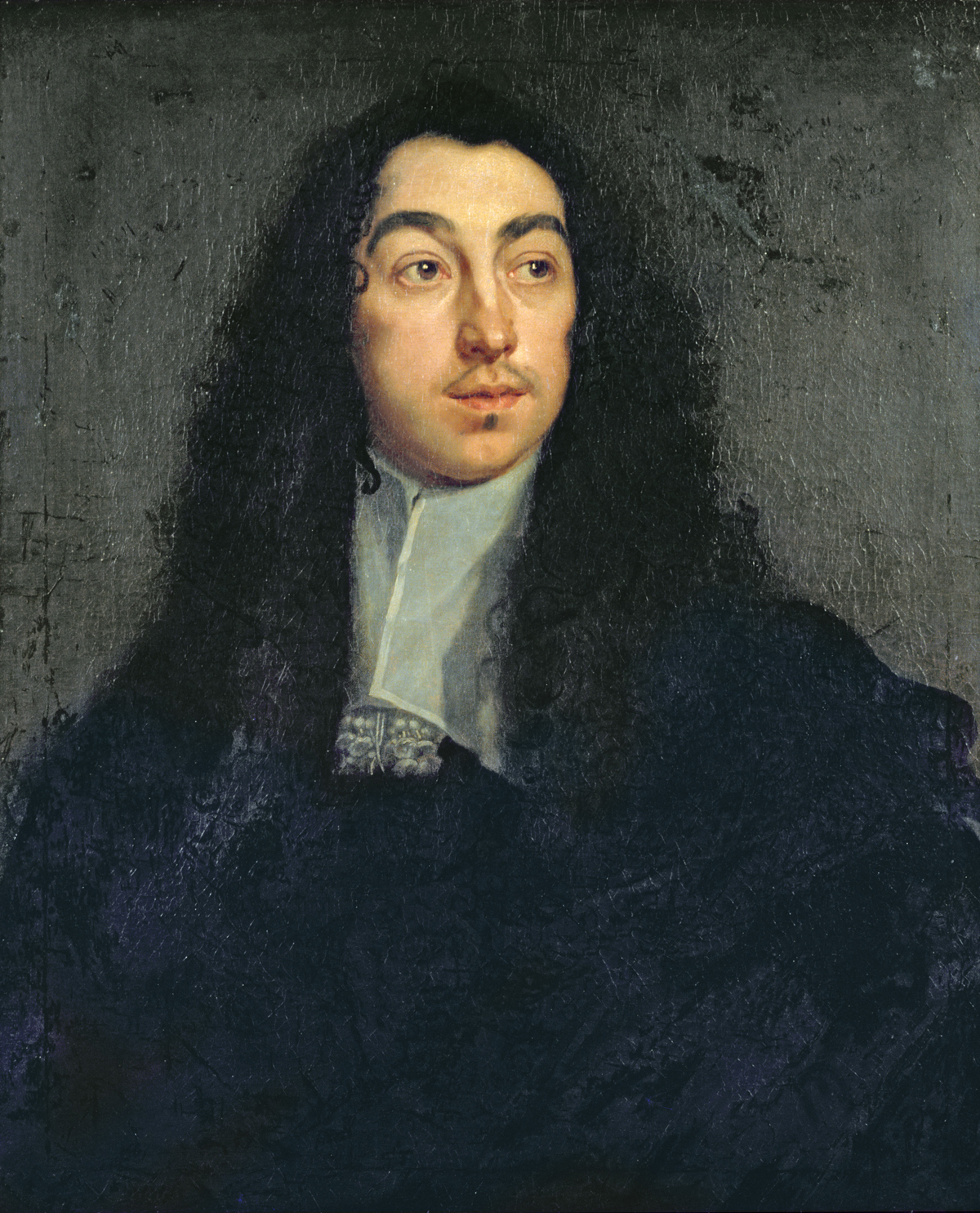
- Born: c. 1621; Exeter, England
- Died: August 1677
- Education: Royal College of Music
- Occupations: Court composer; Music theorist

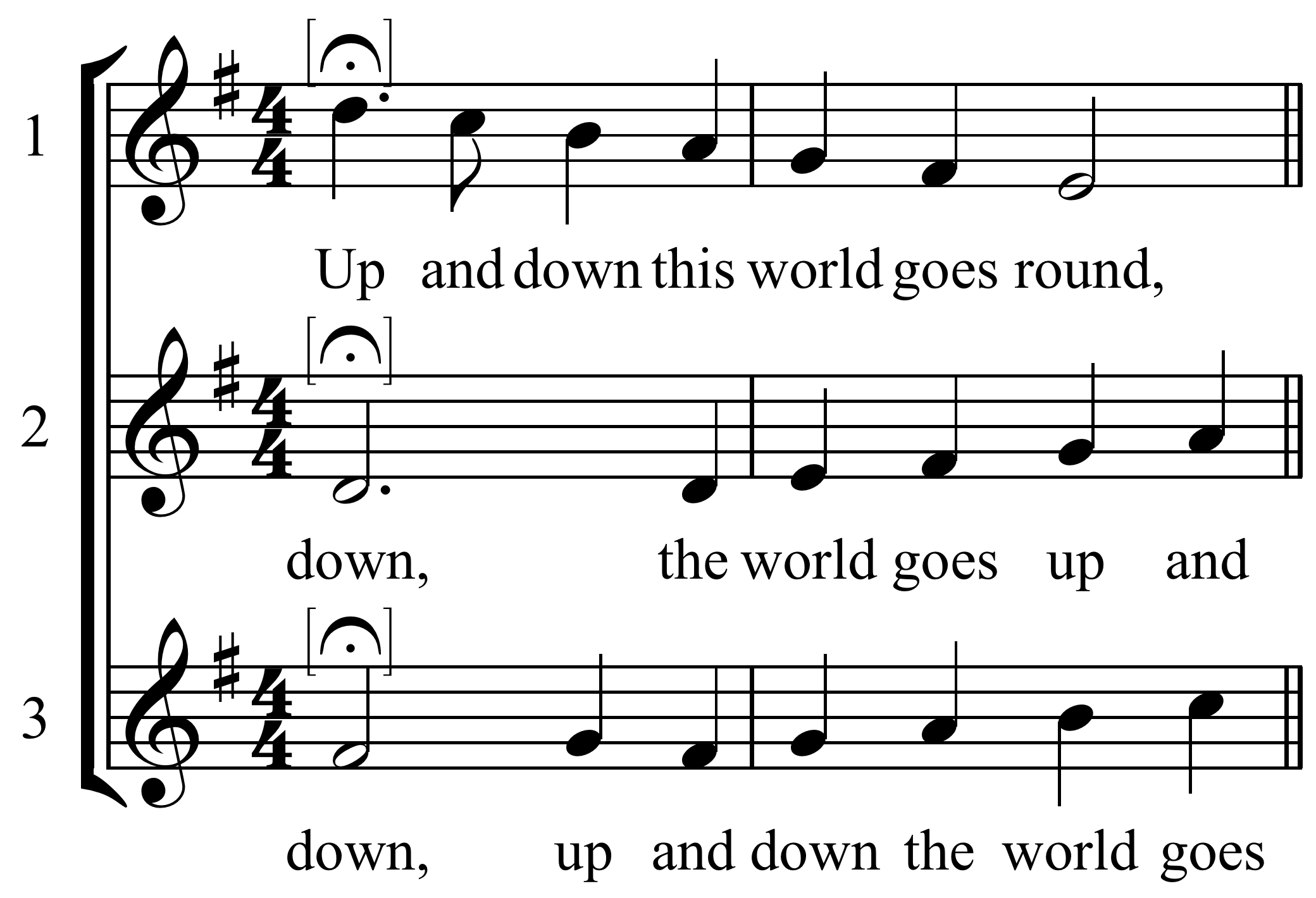
"Up and Down This World Goes Round", three voice round by Matthew Locke.

Matthew Locke (c. 1621 – August 1677) was an English Baroque composer and music theorist.

== Biography ==
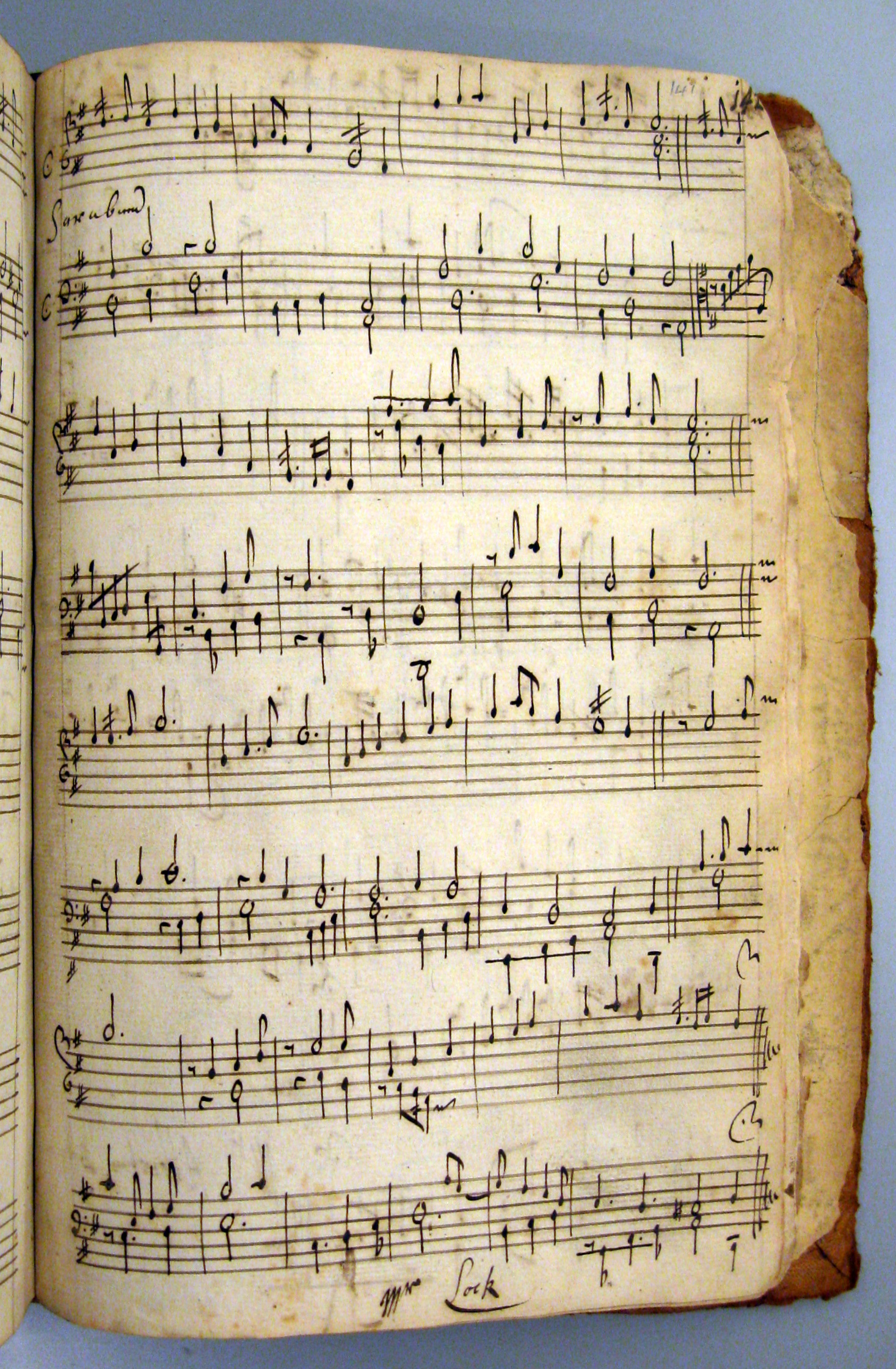
Saraband by Matthew Locke, one of his earliest known keyboard works, found in the manuscript Drexel 5611, a 17th-century manuscript in the Music Division of the New York Public Library

Locke was born in Exeter and was a chorister in the choir of Exeter Cathedral, under Edward Gibbons, the brother of Orlando Gibbons. At the age of eighteen Locke travelled to the Netherlands, possibly converting to Roman Catholicism at the time.

Locke, with Christopher Gibbons (the son of Orlando), composed the score for Cupid and Death, the 1653 masque by Caroline-era playwright James Shirley. Their score for that work is the sole surviving score for a dramatic work from that era. Locke was one of the quintet of composers who provided music for The Siege of Rhodes (1656), the breakthrough early opera by Sir William Davenant. Locke wrote music for subsequent Davenant operas, The Cruelty of the Spaniards in Peru (1658) and The History of Sir Francis Drake (1659). He wrote the music for the processional march for the coronation of Charles II.

Locke's treatise on music theory, Melothesia, was published in 1673. The title page describes him as "Composer in Ordinary to His Majesty, and organist of her Majesty's chapel"—those monarchs being Charles II and Catherine of Braganza. Locke also served King Charles as Composer of the Wind Music ("music for the King's sackbutts and cornets"), and Composer for the Violins. (His successor in the latter office was Henry Purcell, who composed an ode on the death of Locke entitled What hope for us remains now he is gone?, Z. 472; Locke was a family friend and may have had a musical influence on the young Purcell). In 1675 Locke composed the music for the score of Thomas Shadwell's Psyche.

== See also ==
- Drexel 3976

== Sources ==
- Baker, Christopher Paul, ed. Absolutism and the Scientific Revolution, 1600–1720: A Biographical Dictionary. London, Greenwood Press, 2002.
- Caldwell, John. The Oxford History of Music: From the Beginnings to C. 1715. Oxford, Oxford University Press, 1999.
- Harding, Rosamund E. M. A Thematic Catalogue of the Works of Matthew Locke with a Calendar of the Main Events of his Life. Oxford, Alden Press, 1971.
