= Joseph Sabin =

Anglo-American bibliographer (1821–1881)

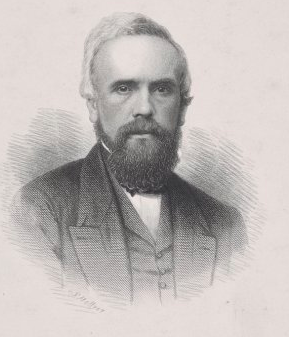
- Born: 9 December 1821; Braunston
- Died: 5 June 1881
- Occupations: Bibliographer, writer

Joseph Sabin (9 December 1821—5 June 1881) was a Braunston, England-born bibliographer and bookseller in Oxford, Philadelphia, and New York City. He compiled the "stupendous" multivolume Bibliotheca Americana: A Dictionary of Books Relating to America, considered a "bibliophilic monument;" and published the American Bibliopolist, a trade magazine.

Sabin was apprenticed to a bookdealer in Oxford in 1821 to learn bookbinding and established a partnership as a bookseller. He married his partner's sister and was father to two sons.

== Move to United States ==
In 1848 he moved to Texas, then to Philadelphia where he worked for publisher George S. Appleton. In 1850 he worked in New York for the auction firm, Cooley and Kees as a cataloger and then at Bangs, Brothers & Co. where he conceived the idea of identifying books related to Americana.

In 1856 Sabin opened a bookstore in New York and later in Philadelphia but the American Civil War depressed sales and he returned to New York to work in the book auction business. He was auctioneer for the collection of John Allan--an experience that influenced the rest of his career. Sabin often collaborated with William Gowans.

After the Civil war the book business boomed and Sabin purchased a business on Nassau Street in New York in 1864. It was a very successful enterprise. Between 1864 and 1874 Sabin sold over a million dollars' worth of books.

From 1869 - 1877 Sabin published The American Bibliopolist. A Literary Register and Monthly Catalogue of Old and New Books, and Repository of Notes and Queries. It included literary notes and gossip, notices of forthcoming books and auction sales, advertisements, and catalogs of books for sale by J. Sabin & Sons.The American Bibliopolist is available online and in many libraries.

His sons Robert T. Sabin and William W. Sabin also worked in the bookselling business and opened a branch in London.

Sabin handled sales of major collections such as the record-breaking sale of the collection of William Menzies in 1876.

At the sale of the library of the musicologist and rare book collector, Edward Francis Rimbault, in 1877, Sabin served as an agent for the banker and collector, Joseph W. Drexel, in his large purchase of portions of the 1877 auction, held in London from July 31 to August 7.

The last book Sabin sold at auction was a Gutenberg Bible.

== See also ==
- Books in the United States

Individual volumes via Internet Archive
Volume	From	To	Year
Volume 1	A [1]	Bedford [4280]	1868
Volume 2	Bedinger [4282]	Brownell [8684]	1869
Volume 3	Brownell [8685]	Chesbrough [12513]	1870
Volume 4	Cheshire [12516]	Costa [17013]	1871
Volume 5	Costa [17015]	Du Moulin [21221]	1873
Volume 6	Du Moulin [21222]	Franklin [25489]	1873
Volume 7	Franklin [25490]	Hall [29818]	1875
Volume 8	Hall [29820]	Huntingdon [33970]	1877
Volume 9	Huntington [33971]	LaCroix [38495]	1877
Volume 10	LaCroix [38497]	M’Clary [43005]	1878
Volume 11	McClean [43006]	Mémoire [47520]	1879
Volume 12	Mémoire [47524]	Nederland [52224]	1880
Volume 13	Nederland [52225]	Omai [57263]	1881
Volume 14	Omaña [57265]	Philadelphia [61980]	1884
Volume 15	Philadelphia [61982]	Providence [66280]	1885
Volume 16	Providence [66281]	Remarks [69511]	1886
Volume 17	Remarks [69513]	Ross [73344]	1888
Volume 18	Ross [73345]	Schedae [77522]	1889
Volume 19	Schedel [77523]	Simms [81225]	1891
Volume 20	Simms (W.G.) [81226]	Smith (Seba) [84187]	1892-1928
Volume 21	Smith (Seb. B.) [84188]	Solis Y Valenzuela [86498]	1929-31
Volume 22	Solis Y Valenzuela [86499]	Spiritual Manifestations [89519]	1931-32
Volume 23	Spiritual Maxims [89520]	Storrs [92256]	1932-33
Volume 24	Storrs [92257]	Ternaux-Compans [94853]	1933-34
Volume 25	Ternaux-Compans [94854]	Tucker [97361]	1934
Volume 26	Tucker [97362]	Vindex [99774]	1935
Volume 27	Vindex [99775]	Weeks [102461]	1936
Volume 28	Weeks [102462]	Witherspoon [104937]	1936
Volume 29	Witherspoon [104938]	Zwey [106413]	1936
