= Edward Francis Rimbault =

English organist, musicologist, book collector and author

Edward Francis Rimbault (13 June 1816 – 26 September 1876) was a British organist, musicologist, book collector and author.

== Life ==
Rimbault was born in Soho, London, to a family of French Huguenot extraction that had emigrated to England in 1685 after the revocation of the Edict of Nantes. His father, Stephen Francis Rimbault, was an organist, arranger and composer. The younger Rimbault was taught music by his father, Samuel Wesley and William Crotch. At age 16, he became organist of the Swiss Church in Soho. His career as a lecturer, for which he was much in demand, began in 1838.

Rimbault edited many collections of music. In addition to editing or arranging contemporary operas, Rimbault took a strong interest in editing or arranging earlier English music. He did editorial work for the Percy Society, the Camden Society, the Motett Society (founded 1841 by William Dyce), and the Handel Society. He was a co-founder of the Musical Antiquarian Society in 1840, for which he also did editing. In 1842, he was elected a Fellow of the Society of Antiquaries, and was granted membership in the Academy of Music in Stockholm, which conferred on him a Ph.D. The reputation of his work was such that he was offered a teaching position at Harvard University, which he turned down. In 1848, he was given an honorary degree by the University of Oxford.

He authored several books, including Bibliotheca Madrigaliana: A Bibliographical Account of the Musical and Poetical Works Published in England During the Sixteenth and Seventeenth Centuries, Under the Titles of Madrigals, Ballets, Ayres, Canzonets, Etc., Etc. (1847), The Pianoforte, Its Origin, Process, and Construction; With Some Account of Instruments of the Same Class Which Preceded It; Viz. the Clavichord, the Virginal, the Spinet, the Harpsichord, Etc.; to Which is Added a Selection of Interesting Specimens of Music Composed for Keyed-Stringed Instruments (1860), Early English Organ Builders and Their Works (1865), co-authored The Organ: Its History and Construction (1855) with Edward John Hopkins, and many others.

He did a small amount of composing. Among his efforts is a tune for Philip Doddridge's O Happy Day, That Fixed My Choice and added the refrain (1854). Perhaps more unexpectedly, he composed 'Happy Land', a Tyrolien-style song with references to yodelling.

Alexander Hyatt King suggested that Rimbault may be best remembered for his magnificent library, which contained many rare items.

He died on 26 September 1876 and was buried on the western side of Highgate Cemetery. His grave (no.3153) no longer has a headstone or any marker. After his death, Rimbault's library was auctioned by Sotheby, Wilkinson and Hodge from 31 July to 5 August 1877, with many materials going to the British Library. About 300 lots (nearly 600 items) were purchased by Joseph Sabin who was acting as agent for Joseph W. Drexel. Upon his death in 1888, the Drexel Collection was bequeathed to the Lenox Library, a precursor of the New York Public Library. Today, the Drexel Collection forms part of the Music Division of the New York Public Library for the Performing Arts.

== Bibliography ==
- The Hymns and Hymn Writers of the Church (1911), Charles S. Nutter and Wilbur Fisk Tillett

== Selective list of publications ==
- Ancient Poetical Tracts of the Sixteenth Century: Reprinted from Unique Copies Formerly in the Possession of the Late Thomas Caldecott, Esq. London: Percy Society, 1842.
- Bonduca: A Tragedy, Altered from Beaumont and Fletcher, the Music Composed A.D. 1695 by Henry Purcell: An Historical Sketch of the History of Dramatic Music in England, from the Earliest Time to the Death of Purcell. London: Chappell, 1842.
- Cathedral Music, Consisting of Services and Anthems Selected from the Books of the Different Cathedrals. London: Chappell, 1843.
- Cock Lorell's Bote: A Satirical Poem: From an [sic] Unique Copy Printed by Wynkyn De Worde. Early English poetry, ballads, and popular literature of the Middle Ages, v. 6, no. 2. London: Percy Society, 1843.
- Cathedral Chants of the XVI, XVII & XVIII Centuries. London: D'Almaine & Co., 1844.
- The Book of Common Prayer, With Musical Notes. Compiled by John Marbeck ... A.D. 1550. Edited by Edward F. Rimbault. London: 1845, (2nd edition: London: Novello, Ewer, 1871.)
- Bibliotheca Madrigaliana: A Bibliographical Account of the Musical and Poetical Works Published in England During the Sixteenth and Seventeenth Centuries Under the Titles of Madrigals, Ballets, Ayres, Canzonets Etc. Etc. London: John Russell Smith, 1847.
- Bartholomew Fair. London: Notes and Queries, 1859.
- The Christy-Minstrel Song-Book, Containing Fifty-Two of the Most Popular Songs, With Choruses and Pianoforte Accompaniments. London: Chappell & Co., 1861.
- Chappell & Co.'s Practical Directions Upom The Art of Tuning the Pianoforte...and a Description of Kemp's ... Amateur Tuner's Assistant; Also, Directions for Tuning the Harmonium. London: Chappell & Co., 1865.
- A Catechism of the Rudiments of Music, Adapted for Beginners in Any Branch of the Science. London: Chappell, 1870.
- A Catechism of Harmony, Adapted to the First Requirements of a Student, Etc. London: 1871.
- A Catechism of the Art of Singing With Practical Rules for the Formation of the Voice, Especially Adapted for the Use of Young Students. London: Chappell & Co., 1872.
- The Old Cheque-Book; Or, Book of Remembrance of the Chapel Royal from 1561 to 1744. [Westminster]: Printed for the Camden Society, 1872.
- The Cheque Book of the Chapel Royal from the Reign of Elizabeth to the Accession of the House of Hanover. Publications of the Camden Society. New series; 3. London: Camden Society, 1872.
- Gallery of Great Composers. Boston: James R. Osgood, 1874.
- Chappell's 100 Operatic Melodies. London: Chappell & Co., [18--?]
