= Music manuscript =

Handwritten sources of music

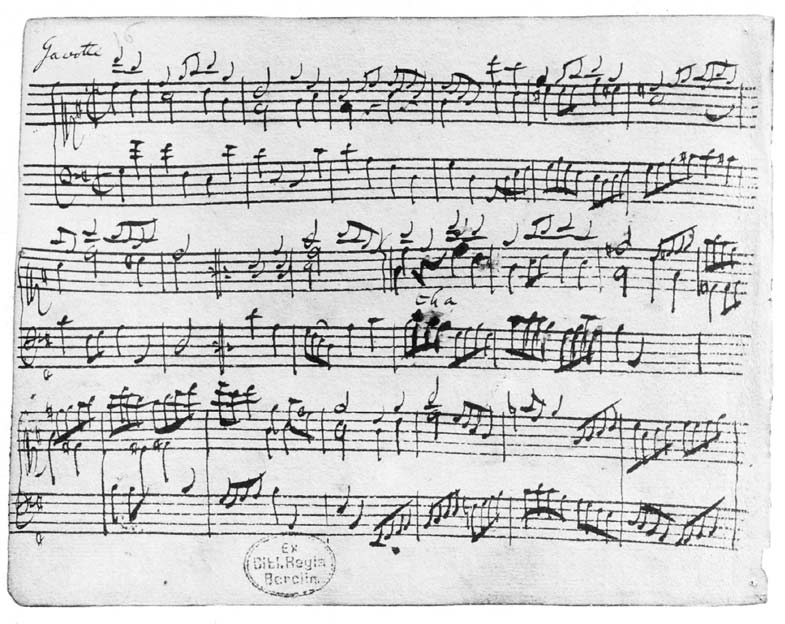
This music manuscript was written by Johann Sebastian Bach and contains the Gavotte from his French Suite No. 5 (BWV 816).

Music manuscripts are handwritten sources of music. Generally speaking, they can be written on paper or parchment. If the manuscript contains the composer's handwriting it is called an autograph. Music manuscripts can contain musical notation as well as texts and images. There exists a wide variety of types from sketches and fragments, to compositional scores and presentation copies of musical works.

== Earliest music manuscripts ==
The earliest written sources of Western European music can be found in medieval manuscripts of the late 9th century that contain liturgical texts. Above these texts small symbols (neumes) indicated the shape of the melodic lines. Only a few manuscripts survive from that time. New systems were devised over the centuries.

== Preparation of manuscripts and copying of music ==
In the past, each composer was required to draw their own staff lines (staves) onto blank paper. Eventually, staff paper was manufactured pre-printed with staves as a labor-saving technique. The composer could then compose music directly onto the lines in pencil or ink.

Until the arrival of more modern methods, music (unless printed) had to be written by hand. For larger scale works, a copyist was often employed to hand-copy individual parts (for each musician) from a composer's musical score.

With the advent of the personal computer in the late 1980s and beyond, music typesetting could now be accomplished by a graphics computer software made for this purpose, such as Dorico, Finale, Musescore, or Sibelius, which has reduced the necessity of music manuscripts.

== See also ==
- Sheet music
- Music engraving
- Manuscript
