= English Virginalist School =

School of music

The English Virginalist School usually refers to the English keyboard composers of the late Tudor and early Jacobean periods. The term virginalist does not appear to have been applied earlier than the 19th century. Although the virginals were among the most popular keyboard instruments of this period, there is no evidence that the composers wrote exclusively for this instrument, and their music is equally suited to the harpsichord, the clavichord or the chamber organ.

The term is sometimes also applied to other northern European composers of this period, such as Jan Pieterszoon Sweelinck and Samuel Scheidt.

== English virginalists ==
- John Blitheman
- John Bull
- William Byrd
- Benjamin Cosyn
- Giles Farnaby
- Richard Farnaby
- Orlando Gibbons
- Edmund Hooper
- William Inglott
- Thomas Morley
- John Munday
- Martin Peerson
- Peter Philips
- Ferdinando Richardson
- Nicholas Strogers
- William Tisdale
- Thomas Tomkins
- Thomas Weelkes

== Collections ==
- The Mulliner Book
- The Dublin Virginal Manuscript
- My Ladye Nevells Booke
- Susanne van Soldt Manuscript
- Fitzwilliam Virginal Book
- Clement Matchett's Virginal Book
- Parthenia (music)
- Priscilla Bunbury's Virginal Book
- Elizabeth Rogers' Virginal Book
- Anne Cromwell's Virginal Book

== See also ==
- Virginals
- Composers of the Tudor period

== Sources ==
- Glyn, Margaret H. (1916–17). "The National School of Virginal Music in Elizabethan Times". Proceedings of the Musical Association. 43: 29–49. doi:10.1093/jrma/43.1.29. JSTOR 765612.
