= Susanne van Soldt Manuscript =

1599 musical anthology

The Susanne van Soldt Manuscript is a keyboard anthology dated 1599 consisting of 33 pieces copied by or for a young Flemish or Dutch girl living in London. Its importance lies mostly in the fact that it is the only known source of early Dutch keyboard music prior to Sweelinck.

== The author ==
According to the conventional account, by Alan Curtis and others, Susanne van Soldt was the daughter of Hans van Soldt (born circa 1555), a wealthy Protestant merchant from Antwerp. Hans probably took refuge in London after the sack of Antwerp by the Spanish in 1576, and Susanne was born there and baptized at the Dutch Church at Austin Friars on 20 May 1586. Sometime after 1605 Hans and his family left London for Amsterdam, where he appears as a shareholder of the Dutch East India Company in 1609. No trace of Susanne has been found, but a sister or cousin of hers, baptized in London in 1588, was living in Amsterdam in the early 17th century.

This has been criticised for ignoring relevant documents. The van Solt/Soldt family has been well recorded but in more than 12 variants of the name. The family did start and record a family chronicle, starting with Paulus van Solt born 1514, which was recopied in the 1800s and recorded in the "Familie Soldt" article by Jurrian van Tolt in the Dutch genealogical periodical De Navorscher for 1935. A more detailed article involving Susanne van Soldt's family is published in the 2007 De Nederlandisch Leeuw Dutch genealogical periodical by Emile van der Spek. Susanne van Soldt was the daughter of Johannes Paulusz van Solt/Soldt de Oude (born 23 November 1550 in Antwerp)and Elizabeth Rombouts. Alan Curtis could have been easily confused due to the fact there were at least three Johannes or variants Hans, Jan, and John in London during this period of time. In 1604 Susanne married Pieter Loos (Peeter Loos or Loose)in Amsterdam. In late August 1615 Susanne died shortly after complications in the birth of her third child. She was buried at the Zuiderkerk in Amsterdam. Her uncle was a well known Dutch artist Jacques/Jacob van Solt/Soldt known for his Italian landscapes. Susanne's nephew was Paulus van Solt/Soldt (recorded also as Paolo van Soldi) the famous Dutch mariner who kept a diary which is noted in many history books on the naval explorations of Asia and Australia. Susanne's father Hans de oude and brother Hans de jonge were also known to associate with famous artists and to deal in art. The family and its connections in the art world are detailed in the 2002 book Art at auction in 17th-century Amsterdam by John Michael Montias. The written van Soldt family history copies are kept at the Central Bureau voor Genealogie and at the Groen Hart Archives.

== The manuscript ==
The compilation consists of 27 folios bearing a late 16th-century Flemish watermark bound in a small volume measuring about 28.5 by 21 cm. Two hands can be distinguished, principally that of a Flemish or Dutch copyist, whilst some pieces, together with a table of notations and various fingering indications are in a later English hand, possibly that of Susanne's music teacher.

Although it would appear that the manuscript was compiled for Susanne, the pieces it contains were current on the continent at a far earlier date, perhaps between 1570 and 1580. It has been conjectured therefore that the manuscript was written in Flanders or the Netherlands and brought over to London by Susanne's parents in the late 1570s, where Susanne's music-master later added pieces 30 to 33, the notation table on folio 2 and fingering indications in the first two bars of the first piece.

When Hans van Soldt and his family left London, the manuscript presumably remained in England, although there is no trace of it until 1826 when it was sold among the effects of the music collector Thomas Jones of Nottingham Place, London, who had died the year previous. (Note: Thomas Jones also owned My Ladye Nevells Booke which was sold at the same time.) The British Library acquired the manuscript in 1873 where it is now catalogued under the reference Add MS 29485.

== Contents ==
While most of the pieces, including the psalm settings, are anonymous, many of the Franco-Flemish dance tunes can be found in other collections of the period, notably the Dublin Virginal Manuscript of circa 1570. With the exception of pieces 30, 31 and 33 (pieces written in a later English hand), there is no trace of influence from contemporary English music. The four-part psalms are the earliest known keyboard settings from the Dutch psalter and are of high quality.

1. Brande Champanje
2. Almande de symmerman
3. Almande de La nonette
4. De frans galliard
5. Galliarde quÿ passe
6. Myn siele Wylt den Herre met Lof sanch Prijsen … 103 sallem
7. Als een Hert gejacht … den 42 sallem
8. Myn God Voet mij als myn Herder ghepressen … 23 sallem
9. Wt de diepte o Heere … 130 sallem
10. Susanna Vung Jour (Orlande de Lassus)
11. Pavana Bassano
12. Galliarde Bassani
13. Almande Brun Smeedelyn
14. Almande prynce
15. Almande de amour
16. Almande
17. Brabanschen ronden dans opte Brand
18. Ontfarmt V over mij arme Sondaer … den 51 sallem / Ich bydde V Helpt mij o God … den 69 sallem
19. Pavane dan Vers
20. Tobyas om stervengheneghen
21. Almande trycottee
22. De quadre pavanne
23. De quadre galliard
24. Heer zich Wil U Wt's Herten gront … den 9 sallem
25. Ghij Volcheren des aertrijcx al … den 100 sallem
26. Bewaert mij Heer Weest doch myn toeverlaet … den 16 sallem
27. Des boosdoenders Wille seer quaet ... den 36 sallem / Staet op Heer toont V onverzacht … den 68 sallem
28. Godt die der goden Heer is sprechen sal … den 50 sallem
29. Ghij Herder Israels Wylt Hooren … den 80 sallem
30. Preludium (John Bull)
31. [untitled]
32. Allemande Loreyne
33. Pavane Prymera (William Byrd?)

== See also ==
- The Mulliner Book
- The Dublin Virginal Manuscript
- My Ladye Nevells Booke
- Clement Matchett's Virginal Book
- Fitzwilliam Virginal Book
- Parthenia
- Priscilla Bunbury's Virginal Book
- Elizabeth Rogers' Virginal Book
- Anne Cromwell's Virginal Book
