= Artus Gheerdinck =

Dutch harpsichord builder

Artus Gheerdinck (1564–1624) was a Dutch harpsichord builder.

Gheerdinck lived and worked in Amsterdam, where he was appointed carillonneur of the Oude Kerk (Old Church) in 1595. This was the same time period that Sweelinck was organist there. Gheerdinck had a workshop in an attic space at the church, and tuned both the church’s organs. There was also a Harmanus Gheerdinck living in Amsterdam in the mid-1600s, but his relation (if any) to Artus is unknown. Harmanus was also a harpsichord builder.

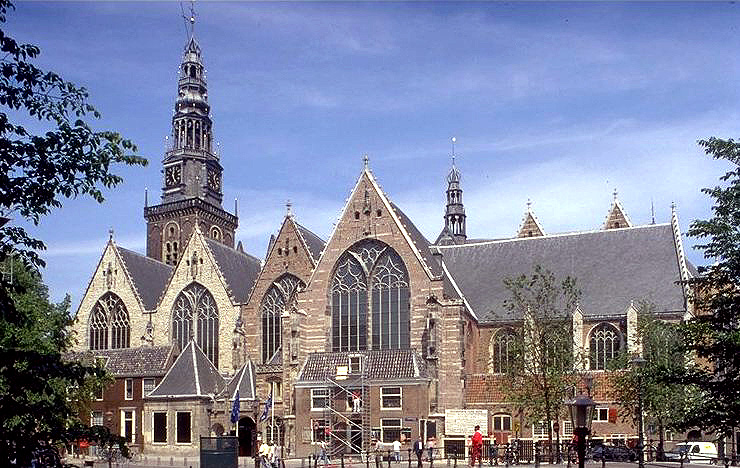
The Oude Kerk in Amsterdam, where Gheerdinck worked.

A single instrument by Artus Gheerdinck survives, a rectangular virginal. It has the range C/E – c´´´ (four octaves), and is currently housed in the Germanisches Nationalmuseum in Nuremberg, Germany (Inventory No. MINe 95).

O’Brien believes that a harpsichord attributed to Hans Ruckers may actually be by Artus Gheerdinck. Though its present range is C—c´´´, its original range was C/E—c´´´. It is currently in the Germanisches Nationalmuseum (Inventory No. MINe 84).

== Discography ==
- Jan Pieterszoon Sweelinck: Organ & Keyboard Music. Siegbert Rampe. MDG 341 1256-2. Dabringhaus und Grimm, 2004
- Peter Philips: Complete Organ & Keyboard Works. Vol. 1. Siegbert Rampe. MDG 341 1257-2. Dabringhaus und Grimm, 2005
