= Virginals =

Keyboard instrument of the harpsichord family

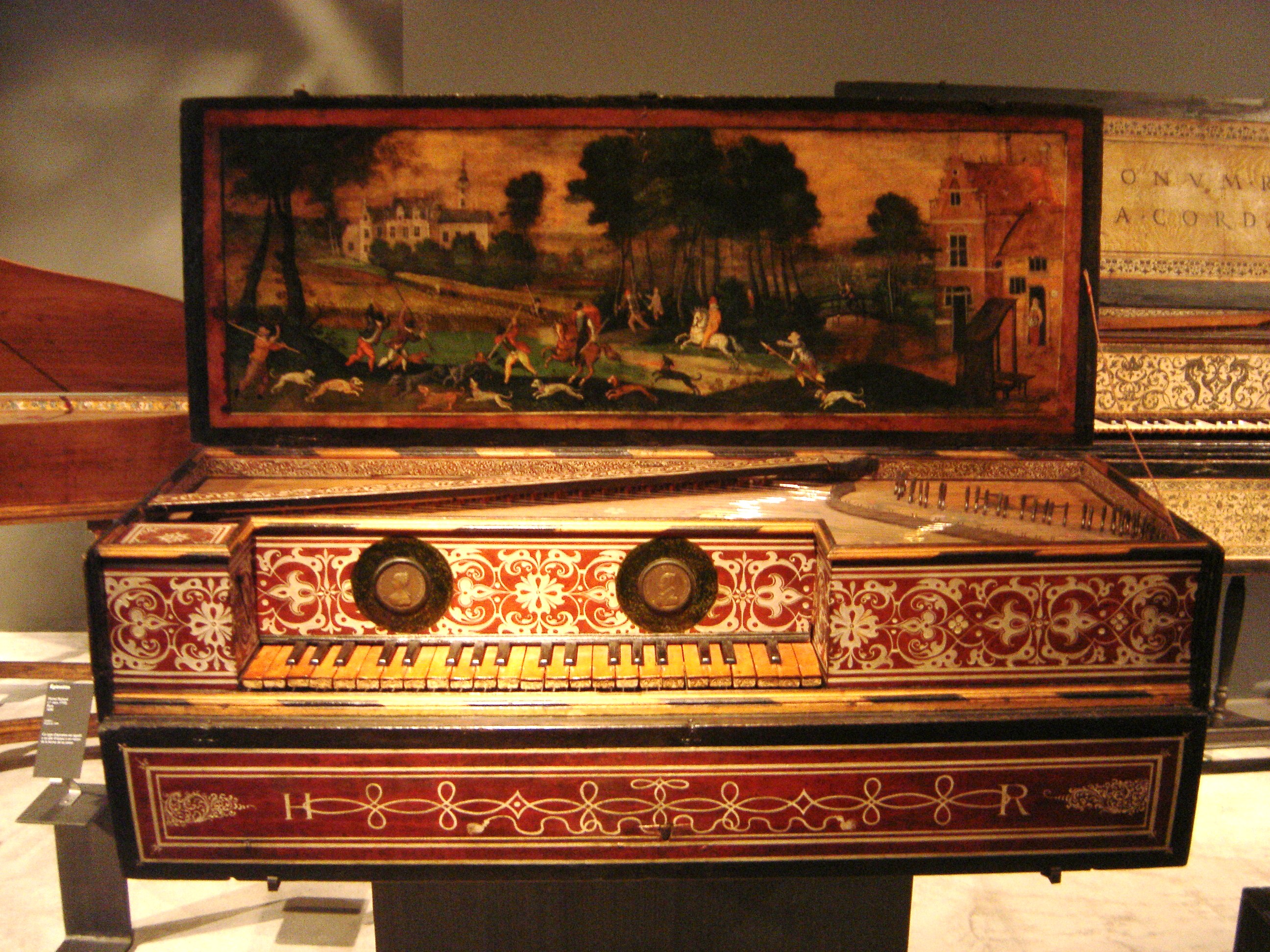
- Flemish virginals by Hans Ruckers, 1583, Antwerp (Paris, Musée de la Musique). Note the inset keyboard placed left of centre.
- Classification: Keyboard instrument

Playing range
- C_{2}/E_{2} to C_{6} (45 notes); some Italian models C_{2} to F_{6} (54 notes)

Related instruments
- harpsichord, spinet, clavicytherium

Virginal from 1668 at St Cecilia's Hall, Edinburgh

The virginals (Note: The plural form may refer to a single instrument.) is a keyboard instrument of the harpsichord family. It was popular in Europe during the late Renaissance and early Baroque periods.

== Description ==
A virginal is a smaller and simpler version of the harpsichord, with a rectangular or polygonal shape. It has only one string per key, in contrast to the several strings per key for a harpsichord. The strings run more or less parallel to the keyboard, on the long side of the case. Many, if not most, of the instruments were constructed without legs, and would be placed on a table for playing. Later models were built with their own stands.

== Mechanism ==
The mechanism of the virginals is identical to the harpsichord's, in that its wire strings are plucked by a set of plectra, mounted in jacks. Its case, however, is rectangular or polygonal, and the single choir of strings—one per note—runs roughly parallel to the keyboard. The strings are plucked either near one end, as with the harpsichord, or in the case of the muselar, nearer the middle, producing a more flute-like tone that's reduced in upper harmonics.

== Etymology ==
The origin of the name is obscure. It may derive from the Latin virga meaning a rod, perhaps referring to the wooden jacks that rest on the ends of the keys, but this is unproven. Another possibility is that the name derives from the word virgin, as it was most commonly played by young women, or from its sound, which is like a young girl's voice (vox virginalis). A further view is that the name derives from the Virgin Mary, as it was used by nuns to accompany hymns in honour of the Virgin.

In England, during the Elizabethan and Jacobean eras, any stringed keyboard instrument was often described as a virginals, and could equally apply to a harpsichord or possibly even a clavichord or spinet. Thus, the masterworks of William Byrd and his contemporaries were often played on full-size, Italian or Flemish harpsichords, and not only on the virginals as we call it today. Contemporary nomenclature often referred to a pair of virginals, which implied a single instrument, possibly a harpsichord with two registers, or a double virginals (see below).

== History ==
Like the harpsichord, the virginals has its origins in the psaltery, to which a keyboard was applied, probably in the 15th century. The first mention of the word is in Paulus Paulirinus of Prague's (1413–1471) Tractatus de musica, of around 1460, where he writes: "The virginal is an instrument in the shape of a clavichord, having metal strings which give it the timbre of a clavicembalo. It has 32 courses of strings set in motion by striking the fingers on projecting keys, giving a dulcet tone in both whole and half steps. It is called a virginal because, like a virgin, it sounds with a gentle and undisturbed voice." The Oxford English Dictionary records its first mention in English in 1530, when King Henry VIII of England purchased five instruments so named. Small, early virginals were played either in the lap, or more commonly, rested on a table, but nearly all later examples were provided with their own stands. The heyday of the virginals was the latter half of the 16th century to the later 17th century, until the high Baroque period, when it was eclipsed in England by the bentside spinet, and in Germany, by the clavichord.

== Types ==
=== Spinet virginals ===
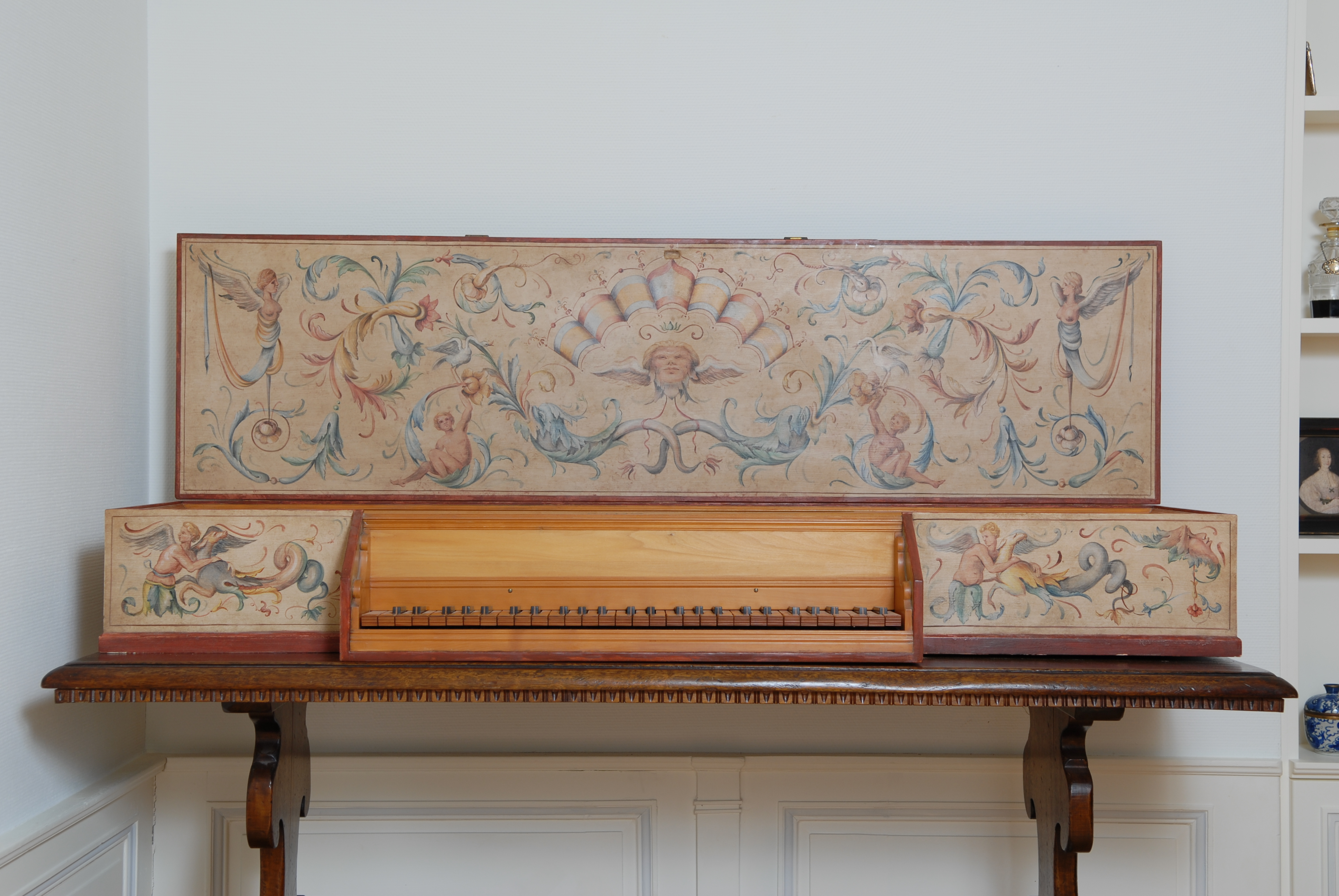
An Italian spinetta or virginals after Alessandro Bertolotti, c. 1586, provided with a false outer case. Note the projecting keyboard, unlike the inset Flemish examples.

Spinet virginals (not to be confused with the spinet) were made principally in Italy (Italian: spinetta), England and Flanders (Dutch: spinetten). The keyboard is placed left of centre, and the strings are plucked at one end, although farther from the bridge than in the harpsichord. This is the more common arrangement for modern instruments, and an instrument described simply as a "virginal" is likely to be a spinet virginals. The principal differences in construction lie mainly in the placement of the keyboard: Italian instruments invariably had a keyboard that projected from the case, whilst northern virginals had their keyboards recessed in a keywell. The cases of Italian instruments were made of cypress wood and were of delicate manufacture, whilst northern virginals were usually more stoutly constructed of poplar. Early Italian virginals were usually hexagonal in shape, the case following the lines of the strings and bridges, and a few early Flemish examples are similarly made. From about 1580 however, nearly all virginals were rectangular, the Italian models often having an outer case like harpsichords from that country. There are very few surviving English virginals, all of them late. They generally follow the Flemish construction, but with a vaulted lid.

=== Muselars ===
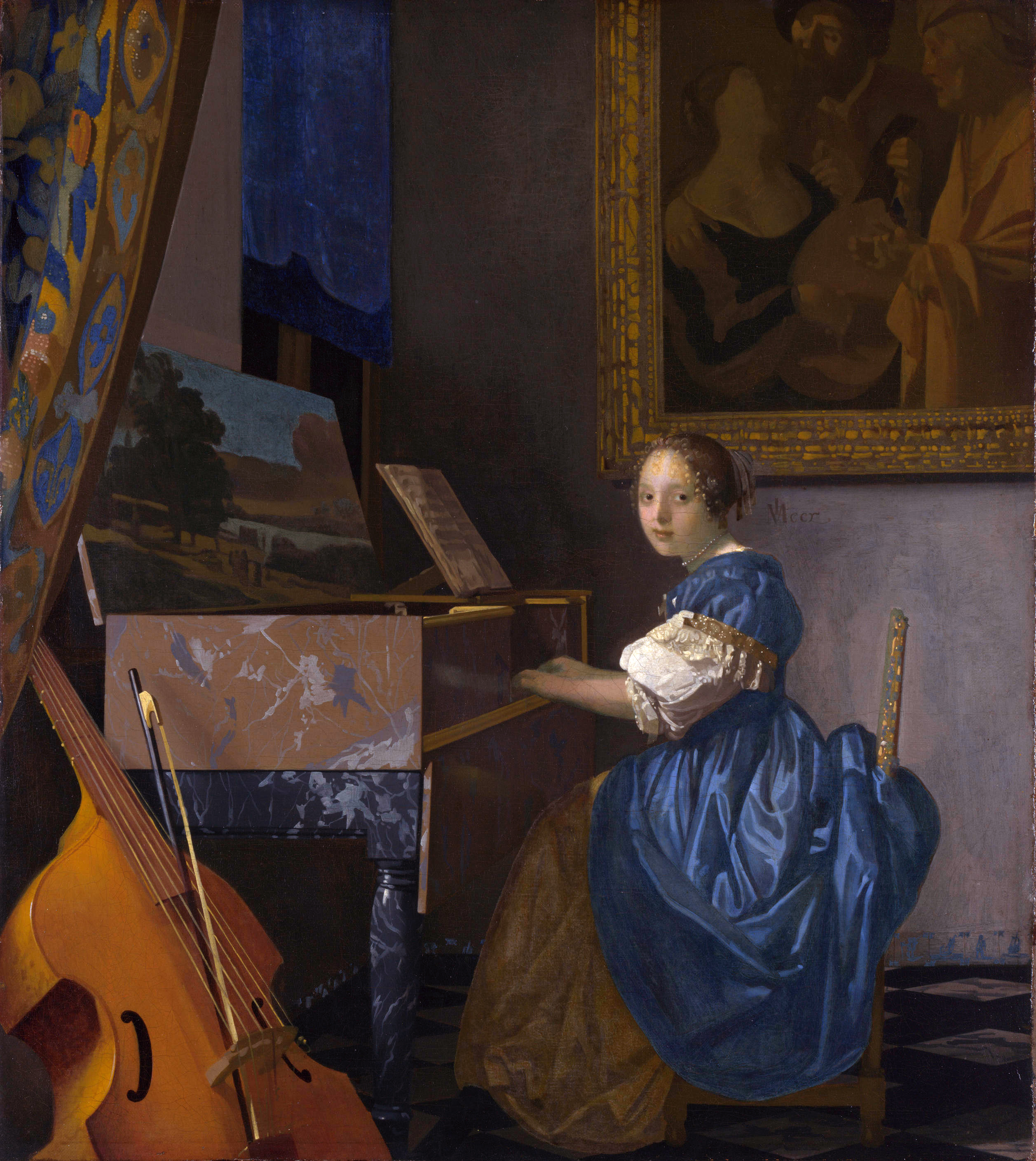
Woman at a Muselar, by Johannes Vermeer, c. 1672 (National Gallery, London). Note the keyboard placed to the right.

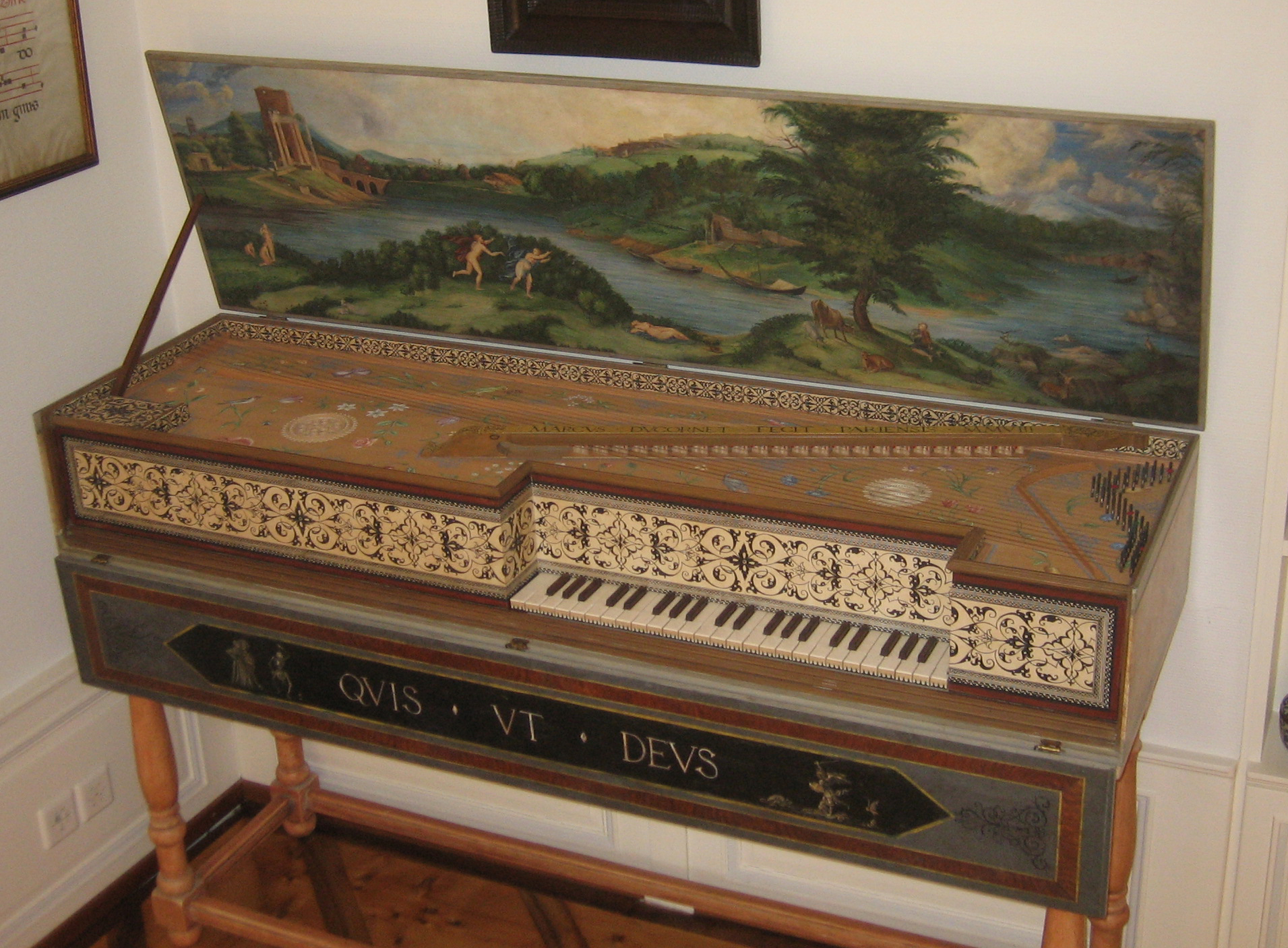
A typical muselar of the Ruckers school. Note the keyboard on the right of the case.

Muselars (also muselaar) were made only in northern Europe. Here, the keyboard is placed right of centre and the strings are plucked about one-third the way along their sounding length. This gives a warm, rich, resonant sound, with a strong fundamental and weak overtones. However, this comes at a price: the jacks and keys for the left hand are inevitably placed in the middle of the instrument's soundboard, with the result that any mechanical noise from these is amplified. In addition to mechanical noise, from the string vibrating against the descending plectrum, the central plucking point in the bass makes repetition difficult, because the motion of the still-sounding string interferes with the ability of the plectrum to connect again. An 18th-century commentator (Van Blankenberg, 1739) wrote that muselars "grunt in the bass like young pigs". Thus the muselar was better suited to chord-and-melody music without complex left hand parts. The muselar could also be provided with a stop called the harpichordium (also arpichordium), which consists of lead hooks being lightly applied against the ends of the bass strings in such a manner that the string vibrating against the hook produces a buzzing, snarling sound.

Muselars were popular in the 16th and 17th centuries and their ubiquity has been compared to that of the upright piano in the early 20th century, but like other types of virginals they fell out of use in the 18th century.

=== Ottavini ===
Both Italian and northern schools produced a miniature virginals called the ottavino. Ottavini were pitched an octave higher than the larger instrument. In the Flemish tradition these were often – perhaps always – sold together with a large virginals, to which the ottavino could be coupled (see Double virginals below). In the Italian tradition, an ottavino was usually a separate instrument of its own, being fitted in its own outer case, just like larger Italian instruments.

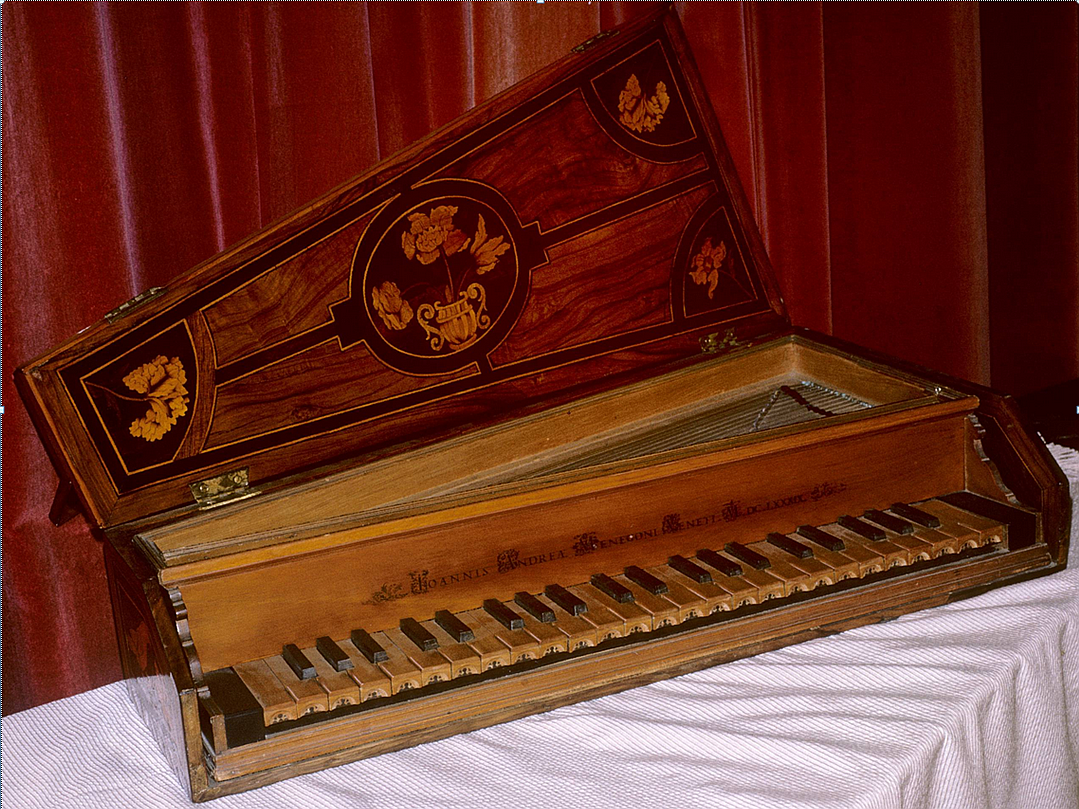
1689 Menegoni Ottavino from the Hans Adler keyboard collection.

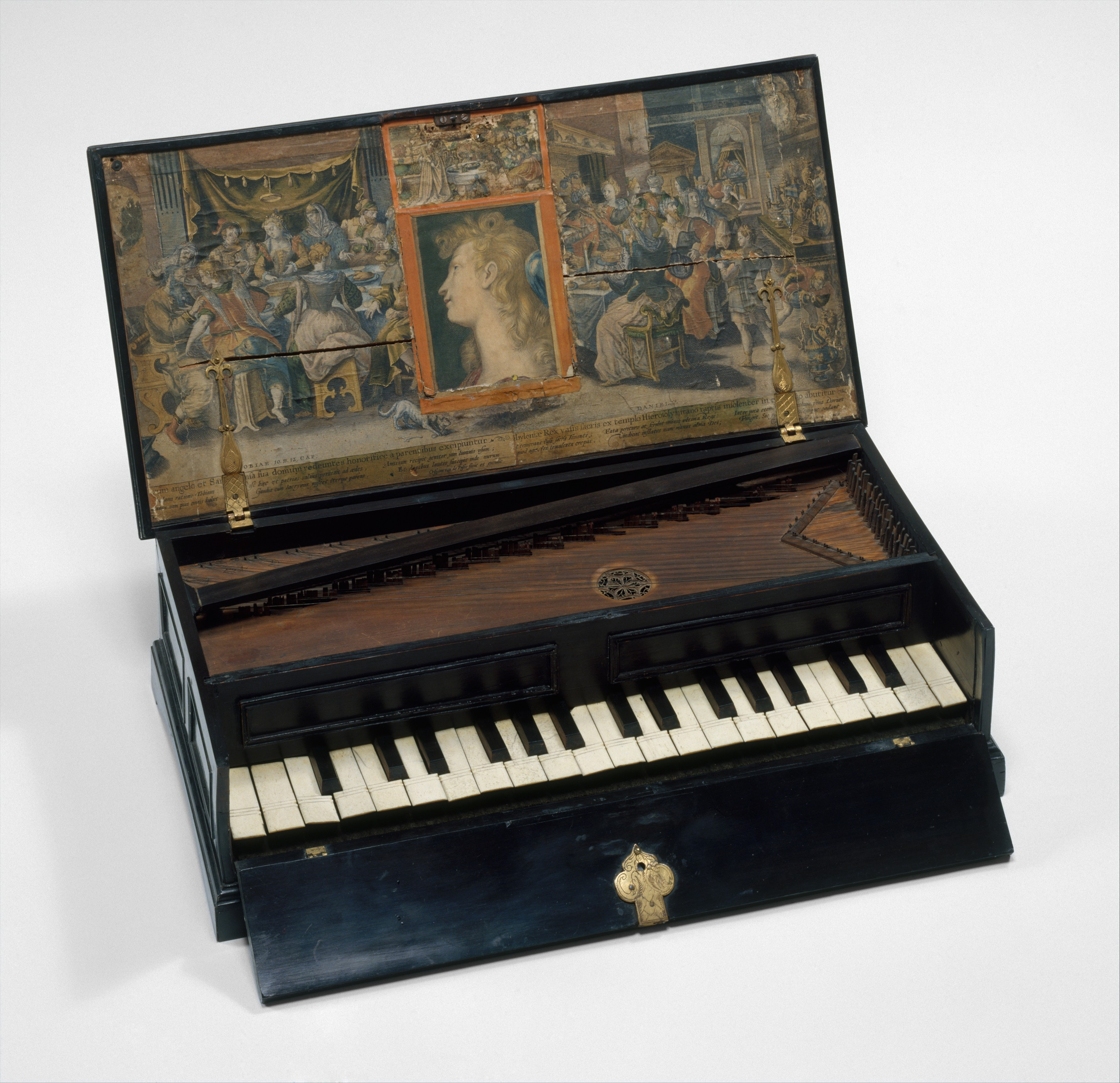
Rectangular Octave Virginal, c. 1600, Metropolitan Museum of Art.

=== Double virginals ===
The Flemish school, in particular the Ruckers family, produced a special type of virginals known as Mother and Child. This consisted of two instruments in one: a normal virginals (either spinet or muselar) with one 8′ register, and an ottavino with one 4′ register. The smaller ottavino was stored (rather like a drawer) under the soundboard next to the keyboard of the larger instrument, and could be withdrawn and played as a separate keyboard instrument. However, the two instruments could also be coupled together, the ottavino being placed over the strings of the larger virginals (once the jackrail was removed), so that the jacks of the latter passed through a slot in the bottom of the ottavino. The jacks of the larger instrument now activated the keys of the ottavino, so that both instruments sounded simultaneously, giving a more brilliant effect.

Among the instruments in the inventory of Henry VIII of England, drawn up by Philip Van Wilder in 1553, there are mentions of "twoo pair of double virginalles", "one new pair of double virginalles", and other obscure references. These predate the earliest extant Mother and Child virginal by 30 years (the 1581 Hans Ruckers), and the earliest known double manual harpsichords by about 60 years. The term may have referred to the number of stops on the instrument, or perhaps its range.

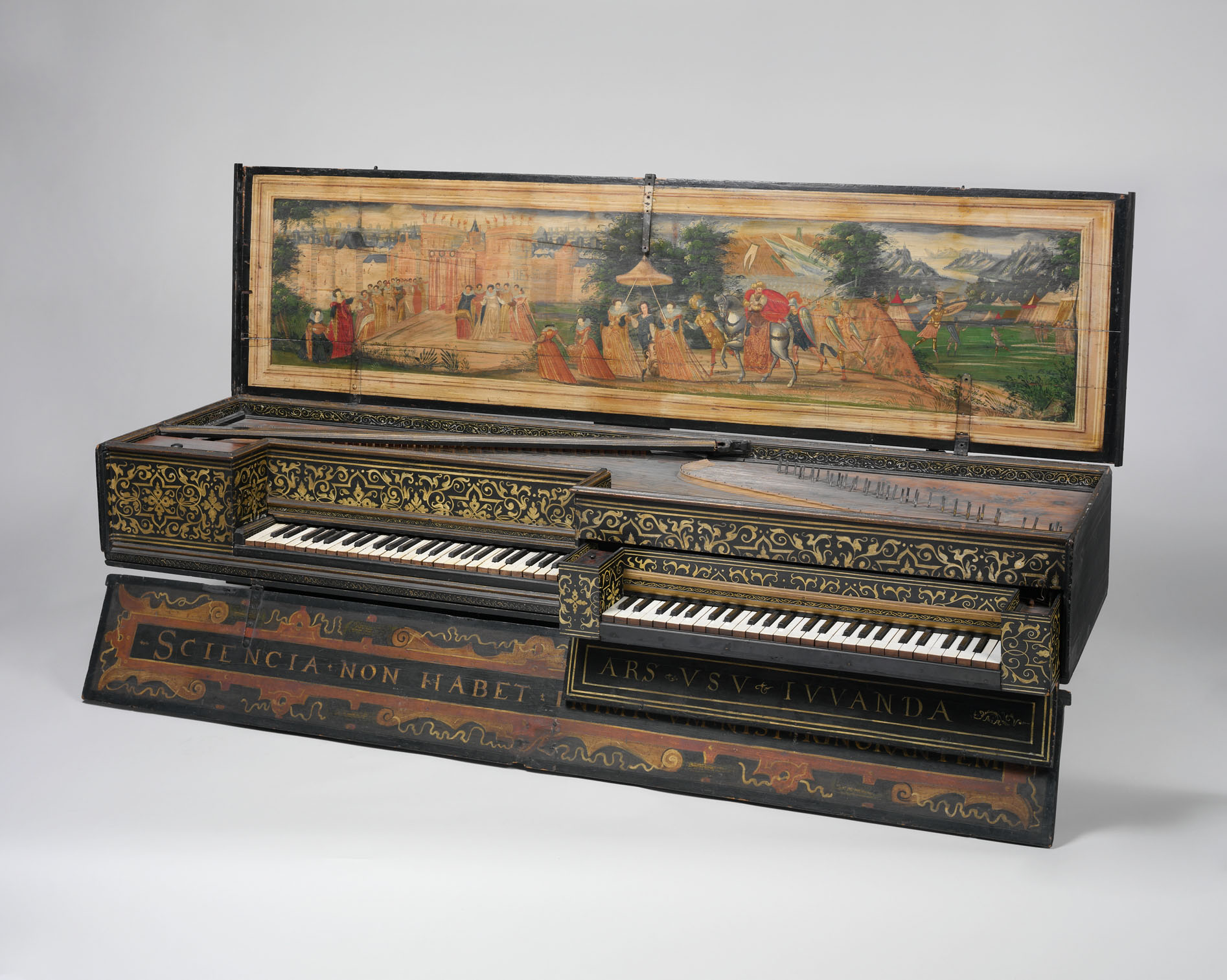
Double virginal (1600) by Lodewijck Grouwels (MET 89.4.1196).

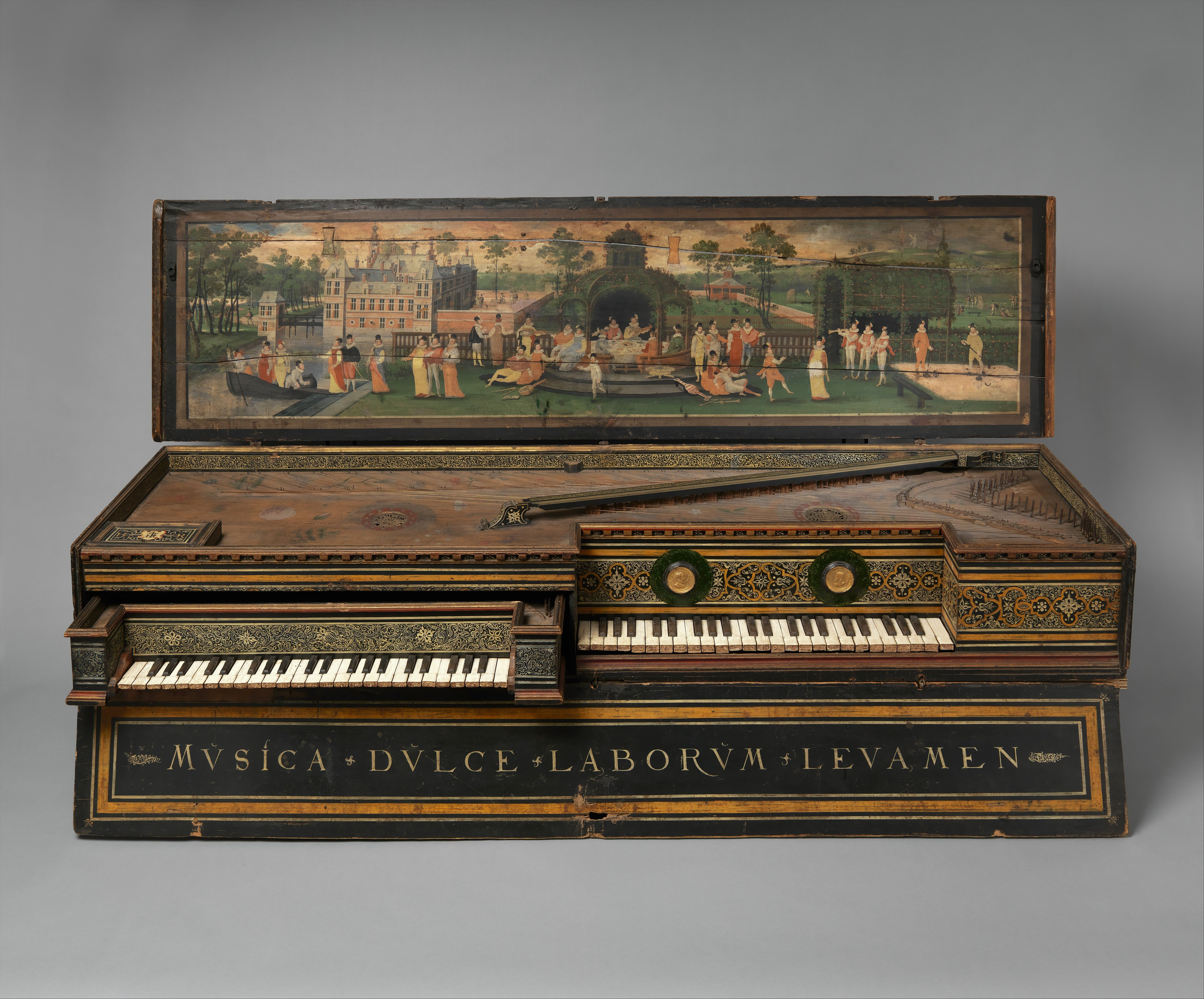
Double virginal (1581) by Hans Ruckers the Elder. (MET 29.90)

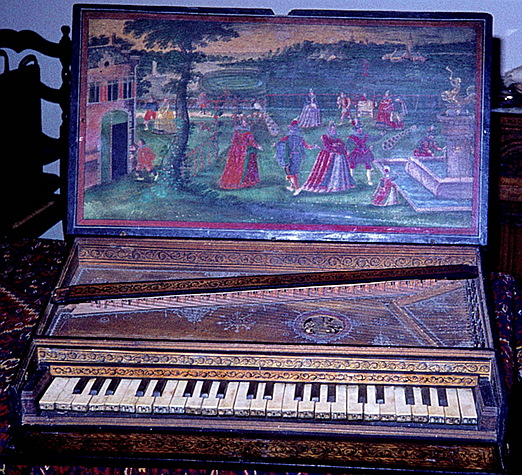
Hans Ruckers' stand-alone virginal (1610) from the Hans Adler keyboard collection.

== Compass and pitch ==
The keyboard compass of most virginals was C_{2}/E_{2} to C_{6} (45 notes, 4 octaves), which allowed the performance of the music contemporarily available for the instruments. The lower octave was tuned to a short octave, so that the bottom E sounded C_{2}, the bottom F♯ sounded D_{2}, and the bottom G♯ sounded E_{2}, thus allowing some frequently-required low bass notes to take over the positions of keys that were rarely used in the contemporary repertory and avoiding building a larger instrument. Some Italian models ranged from C_{2} to F_{6} (54 notes, 4 1/2 octaves).

Virginals were available in various sizes. The Dutch organist and harpsichordist Class Douwes (circa 1650 – circa 1725) mentions instruments from nominal 6 feet (1.8 m) down to 2 1/2 feet (0.76 m). The pitch differences between the models offered by the Ruckers workshops were by no means arbitrary, but corresponded to the musical intervals of a tone, a fourth, a fifth, an octave, and a ninth. Pitch assignments have been suggested for these instruments based on scalings provided by Douwes. Most modern instruments are full-sized ones at 8′ pitch or ottavini at 4′ pitch, although there are no surviving Ruckers instruments at the 4' pitch, and most probably none were ever made by his workshop.

== Decoration ==
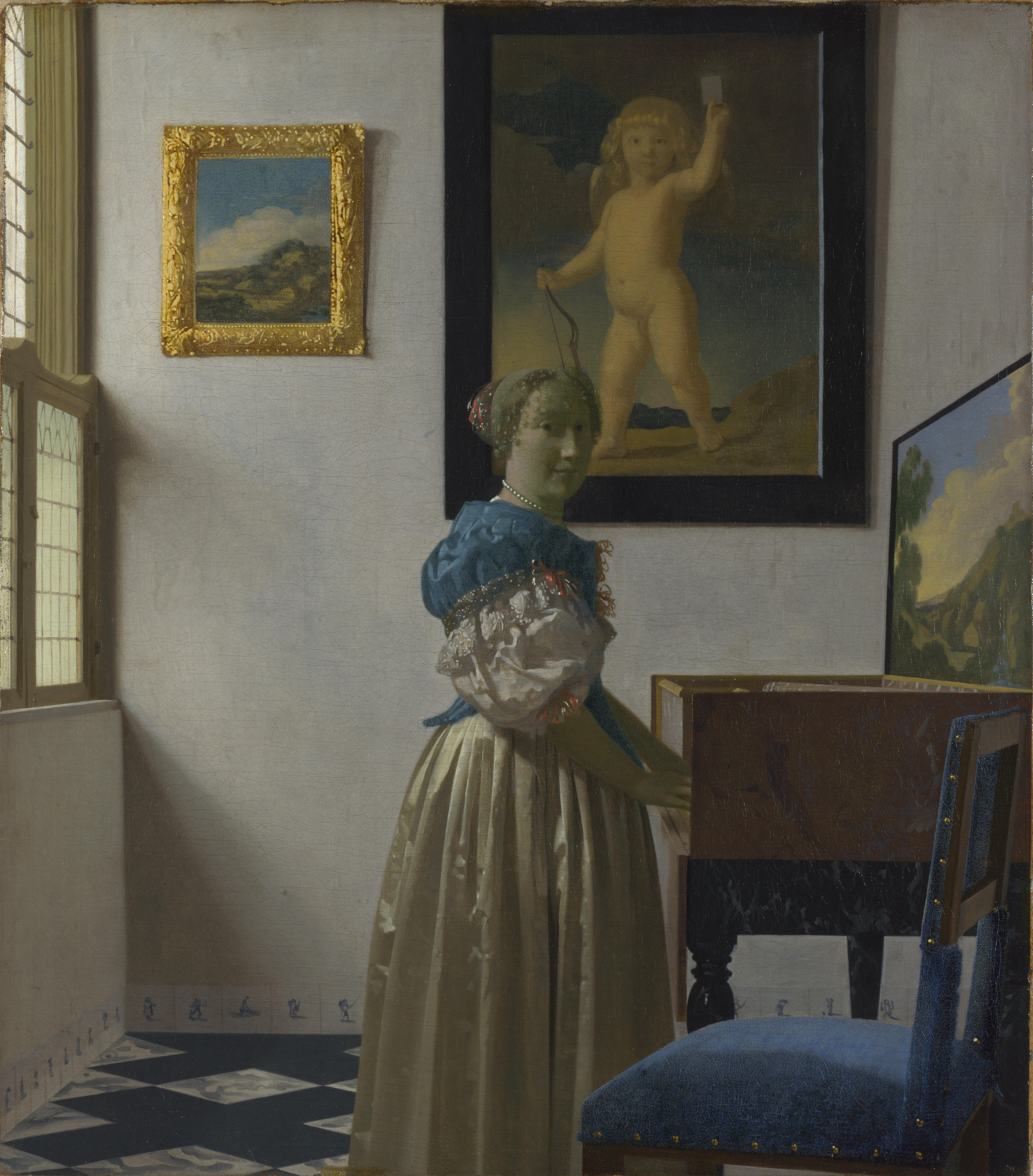
Lady Standing at a Muselar, by Johannes Vermeer

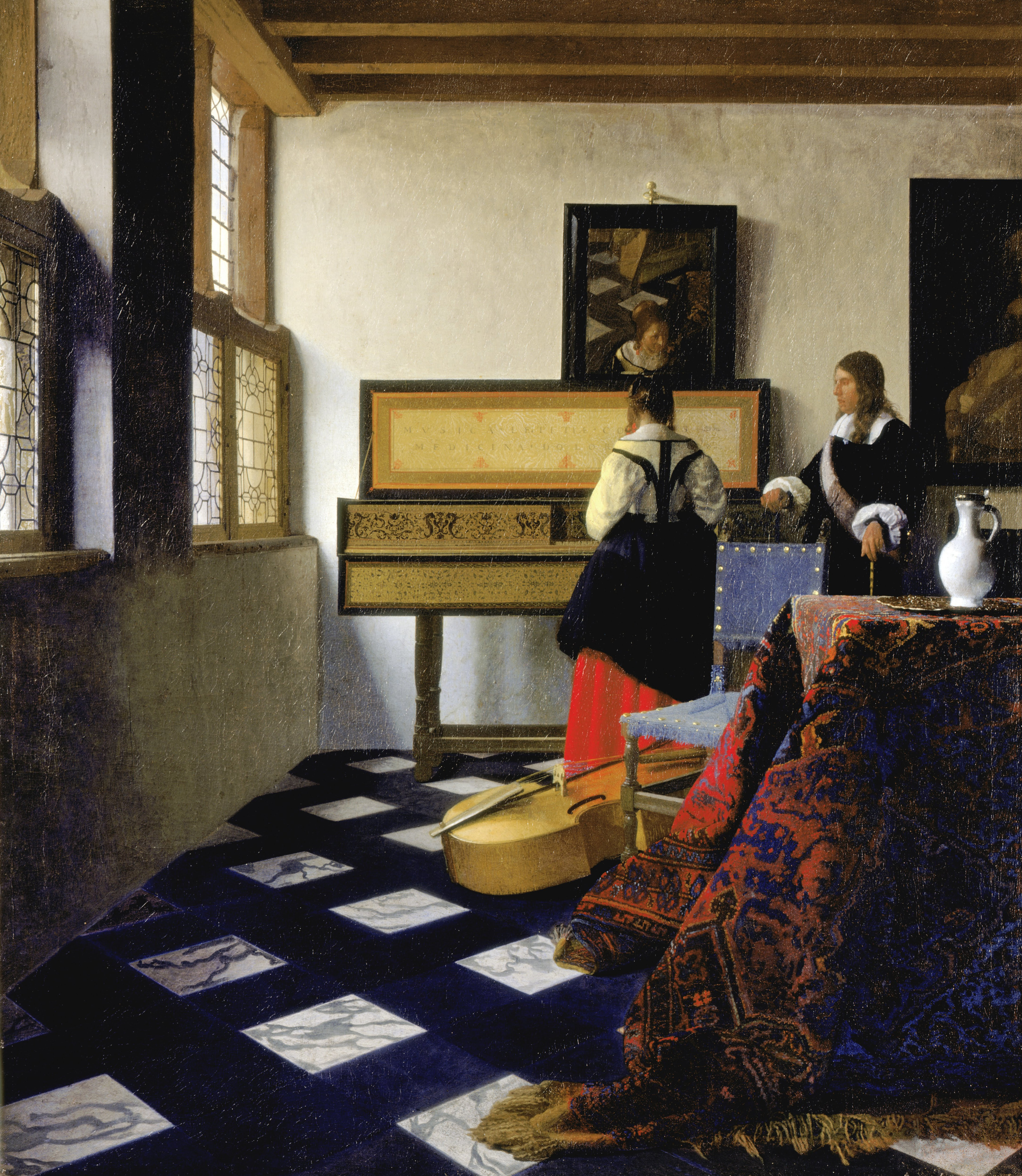
The Music Lesson, by Johannes Vermeer

Whilst many early virginals throughout Europe were left in plain wood, they were soon provided with rich decoration, which may have contributed to the survival of many such instruments. From mouldings on case edges, jackrails and namebattens to adornment with ivory, mother-of-pearl, marble, agate, tortoiseshell or semi-precious stones, not to mention intricate painting, no expense was spared by those who could afford it.

Most Flemish virginals had their soundboards painted with flowers, fruit, birds, caterpillars, moths and even cooked prawns, all within blue scalloped borders and intricate blue arabesques. Many of these motifs appear to be resurrection symbols. Natural keys were normally covered in bone, and sharps were of oak or, less commonly, chestnut. The case exteriors were usually marbled, whilst the inside was decorated with elaborate block-printed papers. Occasionally the inside of the lid bore a decorative scene; more often it was covered with block-printed papers embellished with a Latin motto, usually connected with morality or music. Mottos could also be applied to the keywell batten. Some typical mottos include:

- SIC TRANSIT GLORIA MVNDI ("Thus passes the glory of the world")
- MVSICA DVLCE LABORVM LEVAMEN ("Music is the sweet solace of labour")
- MVSICA DONVM DEI ("Music is the gift of God")

The Dutch artist Johannes Vermeer was one among several who produced paintings including examples of virginals.

There was no such "standard decoration" for Italian virginals. Where there was an outer case, it was often this that was decorated, leaving the actual instrument plain (typically for Venetian virginals). Cases could be decorated with paintings of grotesques, classical scenes, or marquetry, but soundboards were rarely painted. Keytops could be of plain boxwood, or lavishly decorated (as was often the case in northern Italy) with ivory, ebony, mother-of-pearl or tortoiseshell among other materials.

Traditionally, the soundboards of both northern and Italian virginals were pierced with a rose, sometimes two or three in early days. The rose had no acoustic function, and was purely decorative. Although these were a throwback to the rose in the medieval lute, they were never carved integrally as part of the soundboard. In Italian instruments they were usually constructed by combining multiple layers of pierced parchment, so that the final result looked like a gothic rose window, or an inverted wedding cake. In Flemish instruments, the rose was usually cast from lead and gilded, and usually incorporated the maker's initials.

== Composers and collections of works ==
The word virginals could historically be applied to any stringed keyboard instrument, and since there was very rarely any indication of instrumentation on musical scores in the heyday of the virginals, there are hardly any compositions that can be said to be specifically for that instrument. Indeed, nearly all the keyboard music of the renaissance sounds equally well on harpsichord, virginals, clavichord or organ, and it is doubtful if any composer had a particular instrument in mind when writing keyboard scores. A list of composers for writing for the virginals (among other instruments) may be found under virginalist. Although the "virginalist school" usually refers to English composers, it would not be incorrect to use the word in connection with some continental keyboard composers of the period, such as Girolamo Frescobaldi and Giovanni Picchi, or Samuel Scheidt and Jan Pieterszoon Sweelinck.

Out of the some dozen so-called English "virginal books", only Elizabeth Rogers' Virginal Book actually bears the word in its original title: the other collections were attributed the name by music scholars in the 19th and 20th centuries.

A selection of English "virginal books" includes:

- The Mulliner Book
- The Dublin Virginal Manuscript
- Elizabeth Rogers' Virginal Book
- Fitzwilliam Virginal Book
- My Ladye Nevells Booke
- Clement Matchett's Virginal Book
- Parthenia
- Priscilla Bunbury's Virginal Book
- Will Forster's Virginal Book
- Anne Cromwell's Virginal Book
