= William Tisdale =

English musician and composer

William Tisdale also written Tisdall (c. 1570–?) was an English musician and composer of the virginal school. No conclusive evidence about him has yet been discovered. Two William Tisdales have been found in London at the turn of the 17th century: one died in 1603 and the other in 1605.

All Tisdale's known music is represented by five pieces in the Fitzwilliam Virginal Book and two pieces in the so-called John Bull Virginal Book which was bound for the English composer John Bull.

Tisdale appears to have known the Tregians, a recusant family from Cornwall. The Fitzwilliam Virginal Book includes his rich chromatic piece, Mrs Katherin Tregians Paven, possibly written on the death of Francis Tregian the Elder's mother, Katherine Arundell. This link is one of the reasons why Francis Tregian the Younger has been suggested as the compiler of the anthology.

== Music ==
From the Fitzwilliam Virginal Book:

- Almand (213)
- Pavana Chromatica: Mrs Katherin Tregians Paven (214)
- Pavana: Clement Cotton (219)
- Pavana (220)
- Galiarda (295)

From the John Bull Virginal Book:

- [Coranto] (3)
- [Coranto] (4)
