= Anne Cromwell's Virginal Book =

1638 music compilation

Anne Cromwell's Virginal Book is a manuscript keyboard compilation dated 1638. Whilst the importance of the music it contains is not high, it reveals the sort of keyboard music that was being played in the home at this time.

== The manuscript ==
The upright quarto book originally contained 51 pages, five of which have been torn out. It retains its original calf binding with gold tooling, and the initials A.C. are stamped on both back and front covers. The verso of the title page bears a table of note values and four lines of verse:

Fouer moodes in musicke you shall find to bee
But two you only use which heare you see
Devided from the sembreefe to the quaver
Which you with ease may larne if you endevour

Each of the following 33 pages bears eight sets of six-line ruled staves on which are fifty short pieces of music, written in at least two hands. The remaining pages are blank apart from the last, on the verso of which is written:

This Book was my Grandmothers Ann Daughter and Coheiresse of Henry Cromwell Esq^{r}. of Upwood in Coun^{t}. Huntingdon & was dated 1638 But somebody has torn out þe [the] Leaf.

The book is currently in Museum of London

== The author ==
Anne Cromwell was born in 1618, the youngest child of Henry Cromwell († 1630) of Upwood, now in Cambridgeshire. Henry was the brother of Robert Cromwell (c. 1570-1617), the father of Oliver Cromwell, making Ann a first cousin of the Lord Protector. Anne later married John Neale of Dean, Bedfordshire. Her Coheiresse (above) was her sister Elizabeth Cromwell (born 1616) who with Anne may have had a hand in the writing of the manuscript.

== Contents ==
The pieces contained in the manuscript are relatively simple, and written for the amateur performer. Most are anonymous, and consist of songs, dances, psalms and symphonies (masque music). Only nine pieces are attributed, of which six are to Simon Ives (1600-1662), one to John Ward, one to Bulstrode Whitelocke and one to (possibly) Thomas Holmes († 1638). However composers of some of the other pieces can be identified from other sources, and include John Bull, John Dowland and Henry Lawes. The contents (maintaining the original spelling) are as follows:

1. A Preludium (John Bull)
2. A Psalme
3. Mrs Villers Sport:
4. Besse A Bell
5. Daphny
6. The Building of Polles
7. The French Balletto
8. A French Tuckato
9. Fortune my foe
10. In the dayes of old
11. Frogges Galliard (John Dowland)
12. [untitled]
13. M^{r} Wards Masque (? John Ward)
14. The Princes Masque
15. A Toy
16. The Queens Masque
17. The New Nightingall
18. The Meiry Companion
19. An Ayre
20. The Meiry Milke-maide
21. Simphony
22. The Queenes Galiard
23. Simphony
24. Simphony
25. A Corranto
26. A Masque
27. The Meiry old man:
28. The Healthes
29. The Sheepeard
30. The Duke of Buckeinghams Masque
31. The Milke maide
32. The wiches
33. Symphony
34. The Choyce by M^{r} Ives (Simon Ives)
35. [untitled]
36. M^{r} W: M: delight (Simon Ives)
37. The Scotch tune
38. The Blaseing Torch
39. M^{r} Holmes Coranto (? Thomas Holmes)
40. [untitled]
41. M^{r} Whitelockes Coranto (Bulstrode Whitelocke)
42. Simphony by M^{r} Ives (Simon Ives)
43. Among the Mirtills (Henry Lawes)
44. [untitled]
45. An almon by M^{r} Ive (Simon Ives)
46. A Coranto by M^{r} Ive (Simon Ives)
47. A Coranto by M^{r} Ive (Simon Ives)
48. The Maide
49. A Simphony by M^{r} Ive (Simon Ives)
50. al done

== See also ==
- The Mulliner Book
- The Dublin Virginal Manuscript
- My Ladye Nevells Booke
- Susanne van Soldt Manuscript
- Clement Matchett's Virginal Book
- Fitzwilliam Virginal Book
- Parthenia
- Priscilla Bunbury's Virginal Book
- Elizabeth Rogers' Virginal Book
