= Chekker =

European early musical instrument

The chekker (or archiquier, eschequier, scaquer, scacarum, Schachtbret) is a European early musical instrument of the Middle Ages, first documented in 1360, whose exact details are a matter of academic debate. Some have suggested that the name is simply an alternate term for the clavichord, virginal, or similar early keyboard instrument, while others suggest that it refers to a distinctly different stringed keyboard instrument not otherwise well-attested.
