= Clement Matchett's Virginal Book =

1612 musical manuscript

Clement Matchett's Virginal Book is a musical manuscript from the late renaissance compiled by a young Norfolk man in 1612. Although a small anthology, it is notable not only for the quality of its music but also for the precise fingering indications that reveal the contemporary treatment of phrasing and articulation. Moreover, the manuscript is unusual in that each piece bears the exact date of its copying.

== The manuscript ==
The manuscript consists of a small oblong quarto measuring some 15 by 19 centimetres. It is in excellent condition and retains its original binding formed from several sheets of rough paper folded, pasted and stitched to a strip of vellum to form the spine. The manuscript contains 32 leaves bearing two pairs of hand-ruled six-line staves on which are twelve short pieces written in a neat hand.

On the first of the two front flyleaves is the inscription: Clement Matchett ownes this booke 1613, with a table of contents on the verso. The second flyleaf bears a Guidonian hand figuring the Gamut. The end flyleaf bears some doggerel rhyme. The manuscript is precisely dated on the inside back cover: Iste liber per me Clement Matchett eiusdem possessorem compositus fuit in Anno Domini 1612/mense augustaneo/1612.

The manuscript is now in the collections of Panmure House in Aberdeen (Scotland), the seat of the Ramsays of Dalhousie, under catalogue number En 9448. It is possible that the manuscript found its way to Scotland through one Duncan Burnett (circa 1590-1651), a Glasgow musician whose own music book is also in the Panmure House collection, and who may have been related to another Duncan Burnett, physician of Norwich, birthplace of Clement Matchett himself.

== The author ==
Clement Matchett was born in Norwich, Norfolk, in 1593, the son of a schoolmaster. He attended a local school and was subsequently admitted a scholar of Caius College, Cambridge, where he may have studied law. From then on nothing more is known about him.

== Contents ==
Most of the pieces are known from other sources, but numbers 3, 8 and 12 are unique to this manuscript, the last being the only known piece of keyboard music by John Wilbye:

1. My Ladyes left hande (August 13, 1612)
2. Nans thinge (August 13, 1612)
3. Tille valle Monye growe (August 14, 1612)
4. The whislinge Carman (Mr. Byrde, August 14, 1612)
5. Mounsiers Allmayne (Mr. Byrde, August 16, 1612)
6. Farwell delighte: Fortune my Foe (Mr. Byrde, August 19, 1612)
7. The Ghoste (Mr. Byrde, August 20, 1612)
8. My Choice I will not Change (Mr. Bull, August 24, 1612)
9. Preludium (August 24, 1612)
10. A Grownde (August 24, 1612)
11. Pegge Ramsye [John Bull] (August 25, 1612
12. The Frogge John Dowland, [set by] Mr. Willoughbye, August 25, 1612

== See also ==
- The Mulliner Book
- The Dublin Virginal Manuscript
- My Ladye Nevells Booke
- Susanne van Soldt Manuscript
- Fitzwilliam Virginal Book
- Parthenia
- Priscilla Bunbury's Virginal Book
- Elizabeth Rogers' Virginal Book
- Anne Cromwell's Virginal Book
