= Parthenia (music) =

Music anthology

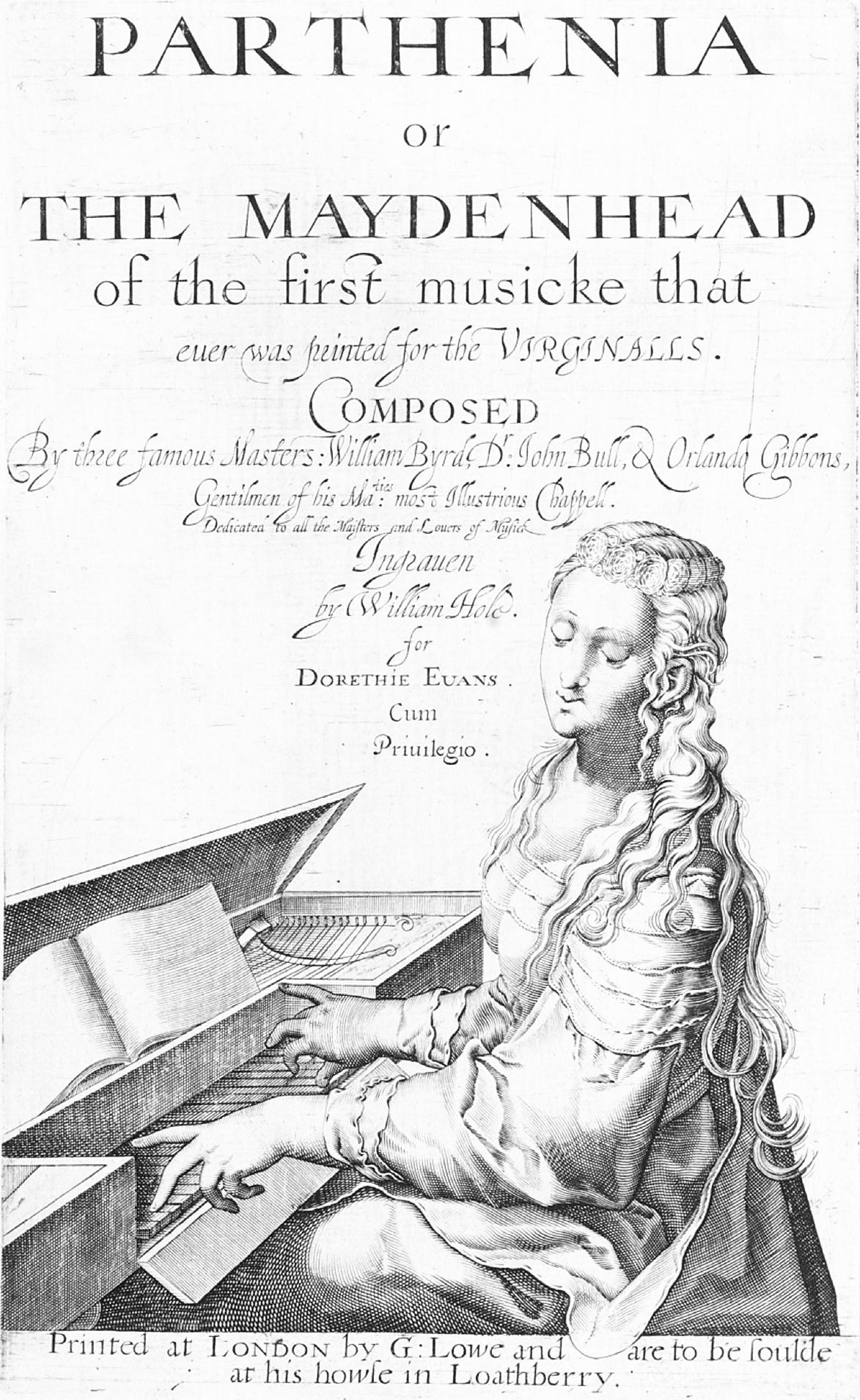

Parthenia or the Maydenhead of the first musicke that ever was printed for the Virginalls was, as the title states, the first printed collection of music for keyboard in England. 'Virginals' was a generic word at the time that covered all plucked keyboard instruments – the harpsichord, muselaar and virginals, but most of the pieces are also suited for the clavichord and chamber organ. Though the date is uncertain, it was probably published around 1612. The 21 pieces included are ascribed to William Byrd, John Bull, and Orlando Gibbons, in three sections.

The title Parthenia comes from the Greek parthenos meaning "maiden" or "virgin." The music is written for the Virginals, the etymology of which is unknown, but may either refer to the young girls who are often shown playing it, or from the Latin virga, which means "stick" or "wand", possibly referring to part of the mechanism that plucks a string in the harpsichord family of instruments. The "Maydenhead" refers to the maiden voyage or, in this case, the first printing of Parthenia. The dedication to the first edition opens with the phrase: The virgin PARTHENIA (whilst yet I may) I offer up to your virgin Highnesses.

== Music engraving ==
Parthenia was printed and sold by G.Lowe of Lothbury, a district of the City of London populated by coppersmiths since the Middle Ages. The music was engraved on copper plates by William Hole. This was the first time that engraving was used for English music scores, although engraved music had been printed on the continent from the late 16th century.

The use of movable type had proved satisfactory for vocal music in particular. However, movable type does not work well with keyboard music. Engraving offers potentially better results. For reasons that are not clear, Parthenia did not take full advantage of the new technology. The music is difficult to sight-read as the notes are not positioned vertically in relation to their values. Perhaps this reflects inability to read music on the part of Hole or, as some commentators have suggested, the work was published as a record rather than for practical performance.

== Date ==
The presumed first edition of Parthenia is undated. However, its dedication suggests it was probably published around 1612.

To the high and mighty Frederick, Elector Palatine of the Reine: and his betrothed Lady, Elizabeth the only daughter of my Lord the king.

This couple was betrothed in December 1612 and married in February 1613. Frederick and Elizabeth subsequently left England, and a further printing in 1613 promptly changed the dedication to read: Dedicated to all the Maisters and Louers of Musick. The last printing was made in 1659.

== Symbolism ==
The dedication refers to the use of the notes "E" and "F" in the music of Parthenia. In this context, "E" refers to Elizabeth Stuart, "F" to Frederick V. The dedication has the phrase

...these next neighbour letters E and F the vowell that makes so sweet a consonãt Her notes so linkt and wedded togeither seeme liuely Hierogliphicks of the harmony of mariage [sic], the high and holy State wherinto you shortly must be incorporat.

The linking of the two letters/notes is evident in the Orlando Gibbons movement The Queenes Command in which he begins the piece with the notes E and F and uses these notes to start future measures or to tie measures together.

== Contents ==
Many of the pieces are dances, the pavane and galliard.

=== List of pieces ===
William Byrd

(BK numbers refer to Musica Britannica: William Byrd Keyboard Music, ed. Alan Brown (London: Stainer & Bell, 2 vols, 1969/71))
1. Preludium, BK1
2. Pavana Sir William Petre, BK3a
3. Galiardo Sir William Petre, BK3b
4. Preludium, BK24
5. Galiardo Mris Marye Brownlo, BK34
6. Pavana Earle of Salisbury, BK15a
7. Galiardo Earle of Salisbury, BK15b
8. Galiardo Secundo Earle of Salisbury, BK15c

John Bull

9. Preludium
10. Pavana St. Thomas Wake
11. Galiardo St. Thomas Wake
12. Pavana
13. Galiardo
14. Galiardo
15. Galiardo

Orlando Gibbons

16. Galiardo
17. Fantazia of Foure Parts
18. The Lord Salisbury his Pavin
19. Galiardo
20. The Queenes Command
21. Preludium

== Sequel ==
A companion work Parthenia inviolata, or Mayden-Musicke for the Virginalls and Bass-Viol was published soon afterwards. The title contains a play on words involving the word viol. This sequel is said to have been compiled by one Robert Hole.

== See also ==
- The Mulliner Book
- The Dublin Virginal Manuscript
- My Ladye Nevells Booke
- Susanne van Soldt Manuscript
- Clement Matchett's Virginal Book
- Fitzwilliam Virginal Book
- Priscilla Bunbury's Virginal Book
- Elizabeth Rogers' Virginal Book
- Anne Cromwell's Virginal Book
