= Elizabeth Rogers' Virginal Book =

Elizabeth Rogers' Virginal Book is a musical commonplace book compiled in the mid-seventeenth century by a person or persons so far unidentified. Of all the so-called English "virginal books" this is the only one to mention the name of the instrument (the virginal) in the title, the others being so-called at a far later date.

== The manuscript ==
The manuscript is a folio volume of sixty pre-lined pages of six staves containing 94 pieces for keyboard and 18 Voycall [vocal] Lessons. It was rebound using part of the original covers, in 1949. The first page bears the inscription Elizabeth Rogers hir virginall booke. February ye 27 1656. However, on the same page the name Elizabeth Fayre is written, and it has been suggested that these two Elizabeths are the same person, before and after marriage.

There are various other writings, including the name "John Tillett", who may have been a subsequent owner of the manuscript, some poetic fragments, and a note concerning the tuning of the viol. There are also three incomplete tables of contents. Four different hands have been discerned.

The manuscript is now in the British Library, catalogued as Add MS 10337. The American Institute of Musicology published an edited version by George Sargent in 1971.

== Contents ==
The pieces contained in the manuscript are relatively simple, and written for the amateur performer. There are settings of popular tunes, dance movements and vocal pieces. None of the keyboard pieces bear a composer's name, and only a few of the vocal pieces are attributed, but many are identifiable from other sources. These include: William Byrd, with his Battel suite, dating from at least 1591; Orlando Gibbons; Henry Lawes and his brother William; Robert Johnson; and Nicholas Lanier. Several pieces are attributed to Thomas Strengthfield, of whom nothing is known, but who may have been Elizabeth's music teacher. Other pieces are attributed to John Balls (died 1622), a wait or public musician of the city of London; and John Wilson, who replaced him.

1. Sr Tho: ffairfax Marche
2. Nanns Maske (Orlando Gibbons)
3. Almaygne
4. The ffairest Nimphes the valleys or mountaines euer bred, & c.
5. The Scots Marche
6. Prince Ruperts Martch
7. One of ye Symphon(ies)
8. One of ye Symphon(ies) (William Lawes)
9. Selebrand (Sarabande)
10. When the King enioyes his owne againe
11. Almaygne
12. A Trumpett tune
13. Essex last goodnight
14. Almaygne per Tho: Strengthfield
15. The Corrant to ye last Alm(aygne) per Tho: Strengthfield
16. Ruperts Retraite
17. Almaygne per Tho: Strengthfield
18. Corrant to ye former Alma(ygne) per Tho: Strengthfield
19. [Untitled]
20. The Nightingale
21. Corrant Bear
22. Selebrand Beare
23. Corrant Beare
24. Almayne
25. Corrant
26. Corrant Beare
27. Corrant Beare
28. The Battaile (William Byrd): The Souldiars summons
29. The Martch of ffoote
30. (The) Martch (of) horse
31. The Trumpetts
32. The Irish Martch
33. Bagpipes
34. The Drum and fflute
35. The Martch (to) ye ffight
36. Tarra-tantarra
37. (The) Battell Joyned
38. Retrait
39. The Buriing of the dead
40. The Souldiers delight
41. Corrant
42. Selebrand
43. A Maske
44. Corrant
45. Selebrand
46. Ly still my Deare
47. The Chestnut
48. Cloris sight (sighed)
49. Now ye springe is comne
50. Oh Iesu meeke
51. Corrant
52. Corrant
53. Maske
54. Corrant
55. Almaygne
56. Lupus Ayre (Thomas Lupo?)
57. Could thine incomparable eye
58. Almaygne: Mr Johnson (Orlando Gibbons)
59. Mock-Nightingale
60. What if the King should come to ye City
61. The Kings Complaint
62. Almaygne
63. Corrant
64. Selebrand
65. My delyght
66. A Scotts Tuen
67. An Irish Toy
68. Allmayne
69. The spaynard (Spaniard)
70. [Untitled]
71. Selabrand
72. The ffinex (Phoenix)
73. The faithfull Brothers
74. A Corant
75. This soldier loues
76. Carron o carron (Charon)
77. A horne pipe
78. Almaygne
79. Corrant per Tho: Strengthfield
80. Selebrand
81. Almaine
82. Corant
83. Almaygne
84. I wish noe more (Nicolas Lanier)
85. [Untitled]
86. Selebrand
87. Loue is strange
88. Almaygne Mercure
89. Glory of ye North
90. Almaine
91. Merceur (Mercury)
92. Corrant
93. Corrant
94. Phill: Porters Lamentation
95. Psalme 42 (William Lawes)
96. Must your faire
97. Since tis my fate
98. No flattring pellow
99. Baloo my boy
100. Ile wish no more
101. Deerest loue
102. No noe I tell ye no
103. O that myne eyes
104. Yes I could loue
105. Lett god the god of Battaile Rize
106. Sing to the king of kings (William Lawes)
107. Psalme 39. verse 12 (William Lawes)
108. I preethe sweete (Henry Lawes)
109. fyer (Nicholas Lanier: lyrics by Thomas Campion)
110. Come you pritty (Thomas Campion)
111. All you forsaken louers
112. Think not deare (William and Henry Lawes)

== See also ==
- The Mulliner Book
- The Dublin Virginal Manuscript
- My Ladye Nevells Booke
- Susanne van Soldt Manuscript
- Clement Matchett's Virginal Book
- Fitzwilliam Virginal Book
- Parthenia
- Priscilla Bunbury's Virginal Book
- Anne Cromwell's Virginal Book
