= The Mulliner Book =

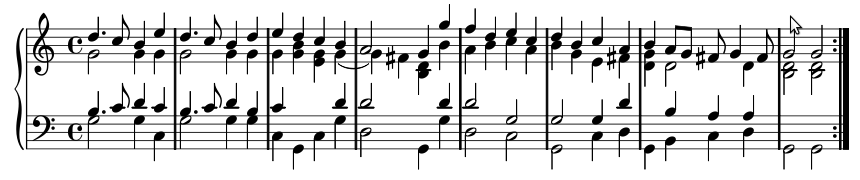
Incipit of "La Bounette", The Mulliner Book, no. 13.

The Mulliner Book (British Library Add MS 30513 (Note: The book is described as: "Paper; late Henry VIII. Oblong octavo. In the original binding, stamped with Tudor rose, portcullis and fleur-de-lys, and the initials H[enricus] R[ex]" [note: these initials are now thought to be those of the binder]. "Collection of compositions apparently arranged for organ and virginals, on two staves of from 5 to 8 lines each, or a single stave of from 11 to 13 lines. Probably in the hand of Thomas Mulliner, Master of the Choir of St. Paul's Cathedral, who appears to have been the original owner of the MS, as testified by John Heywood (virginal player to Edward VI) and who is evidently the T.M. mentioned.")) is a historically important musical commonplace book compiled probably between about 1545 and 1570, by Thomas Mulliner, about whom practically nothing is known, except that he figures in 1563 as modulator organorum (organist) of Corpus Christi College, Oxford. He is believed to have previously resided in London, where John Heywood inscribed the title page of the manuscript Sum liber thomas mullineri / iohanne heywoode teste. ('I am Thomas Mulliner's book, with John Heywood as witness.'). A later annotation on the same page states that: T. Mulliner was Master of St Pauls school, but this has so far proved unsupportable. The provenance of the MS is unknown before it appears in the library of John Stafford Smith in 1776. After passing through the hands of Edward Francis Rimbault the MS was given to the British Museum in 1877 by William Hayman Cummings.

== Contents ==
Of the 121 keyboard pieces over half are based on Catholic liturgical chants, and most of the rest are transcriptions of part songs and anthems, some twenty or so of which are secular. There are only two dance pieces and no variations. There are also nine pieces for the cittern, the earliest extant music for this instrument. The sixteen named composers represented are among the most important of the time, including Thomas Tallis (18 pieces), John Redford (35 pieces), John Blitheman (15 pieces), John Taverner (1 piece), William Shelbye (two pieces) and Christopher Tye (2 pieces). Nineteen pieces are unattributed.

== See also ==
- The Dublin Virginal Manuscript
- My Ladye Nevells Booke
- Susanne van Soldt Manuscript
- Clement Matchett's Virginal Book
- Fitzwilliam Virginal Book
- Parthenia (music)
- Priscilla Bunbury's Virginal Book
- Elizabeth Rogers' Virginal Book
- Anne Cromwell's Virginal Book
