= The Huntes upp =

Ballad

The Huntes upp is a sixteenth-century ballad attributed to William Gray.

== Background ==
The hunt is up was commonly associated to any song that would be sung in the morning. Shakespeare employs it as such in Romeo and Juliet (act iii, sc. 5).

== Description ==
There is a keyboard version in C major by William Byrd. The work is included in two of the most important collections of keyboard music of the Renaissance, My Ladye Nevells Booke and the Fitzwilliam Virginal Book. The copying of My Ladye Nevells Booke, which contains a selection of Byrd's keyboard pieces, was completed in 1591. The Huntes upp is believed, on stylistic grounds, to be one of the earlier pieces in the collection

The piece has 11 variations on the songs The Hunt is Up and The Nine Muses. It is usually played on a harpsichord or piano and takes around 7 minutes.

== Lyrics ==
The lyrics are:

The hunt is up, the hunt is up,
And it is a well nigh daye;
And Harry our King is gone hunting,
To bring his deere to baye.

The east is bright with morning light,
And darkness it is fled,
And the merie horn wakes up the morne
To leave his idle bed.

Beholde the skyes with golden dyes
Are glowing all around,
The grasse is greene, and so are the treene
All laughing at the sound.

The horses snort to be at the sport,
The dogges are running free,
The wooddes rejoyce at the mery noise
Of hey tantara tee ree!

The sunne is glad to see us clad,
All in our lustie greene,
And smiles in the skye as he riseth hye,
To see and to be seen.

Awake, all men, I say agen,
Be mery as you maye,
For Harry our King is gone hunting,
to bring his deere to baye.
