= William Shelbye =

English organist and composer

William Shelbye, also referred to as Selby, Selbie or Selbye (died 1584) was an English organist and composer.

Shelbye was organist and master of the choristers at Canterbury Cathedral (c.1541–1584). He was the composer of two keyboard works that appear in The Mulliner Book, a commonplace book compiled between about 1545 and 1570. They were the antiphon Miserere and Felix namque, an offertory setting the Sarum plainchant. The Miserere anticipates techniques later used by Thomas Tallis, William Byrd and Thomas Tomkins. He died in Canterbury.

Joseph Payne recorded the Miserere.
