= Dublin Virginal Manuscript =

The Dublin Virginal Manuscript is an important anthology of keyboard music kept in the library of Trinity College Dublin, where it has been since the 17th century under the present shelf-list TCD Ms D.3.29.

== History ==
The Manuscript was probably purchased by Archbishop James Ussher, who from 1603 was sent to England on frequent voyages to buy books "to furnish the Library of the University of Dublin". The name "Dublin Virginal Manuscript" is modern, and there is no mention of any specific instrument for which the music was intended.

== Description ==
The manuscript, consisting of 72 pages, is contained in a small oblong volume 5.5 x 7.4 inches. At some time it was bound together with the Dallis Lute Book (of perhaps 1583), but the two volumes are in different hands and the collection of keyboard pieces forms a separate and independent manuscript.

The manuscript is undated and its 30 pieces are without titles apart from one, ascribed to a "Mastyre Taylere". All but four of the pieces are arrangements of popular song and dance tunes found in other, mainly continental sources, such as Tielman Susato, Adrian Le Roy and Petrus Phalesius the Elder. From these, together with stylistic evidence, the manuscript can be dated to circa 1570.

Most of the music is written in a neat hand on seven-line staves. That for the right hand is written with a c-clef placed on the first or second line from the bottom. Music for the left hand is written with an f-clef, usually placed on the fourth or fifth line from the bottom. All repetitions are copied out, even if there is no change in the music.

The Dublin Virginal Manuscript is important in the history of English keyboard music because of its date, being one of only five English secular keyboard sources that predate William Byrd's My Ladye Nevells Booke of 1591. It is also the second-oldest surviving English source (after the Mulliner Book) of early Almain tunes, of which it contains four. The Dublin Virginal Manuscript also represents an important step in the development of secular English keyboard music from around 1530 to its golden age in the late 16th century, with examples of developing counterpoint in some pieces.

== Contents ==
The titles following are taken from other sources with analogous tunes:

1. Passing Measures Pavan
2. Galliard to the Passing Measures Pavan
3. Pavan "Mastyre Taylere"
4. Galliard to the pavan before
5. Pavan
6. Galliard to the pavan before
7. Pavan
8. Galliard to the pavan before
9. Variations on the romanesca
10. Divisions on the Goodnight ground
11. The Earl of Essex Measure
12. Branle Hoboken
13. Was not good King Solomon
14. Dance
15. Almande du prince
16. Le Reprinse of the Almande du Prince
17. Galliard
18. Almande Le Pied de Cheval
19. Almande Bruynsmedelijn
20. L'homme armé alias Lumber me
21. Pavan
22. Galliard to the pavan before
23. Galliard
24. Like as the lark within the marleon's foot
25. Turkeylony
26. Pavan
27. Galliard to the pavan before
28. Dance
29. Dance
30. Variations on Chi passa

== See also ==
- The Mulliner Book
- My Ladye Nevells Booke
- Susanne van Soldt Manuscript
- Clement Matchett's Virginal Book
- Fitzwilliam Virginal Book
- Parthenia
- Priscilla Bunbury's Virginal Book
- Elizabeth Rogers' Virginal Book
- Anne Cromwell's Virginal Book

== Scores ==
- Variations on the Romanesca
