= Fitzwilliam Virginal Book =

Music book

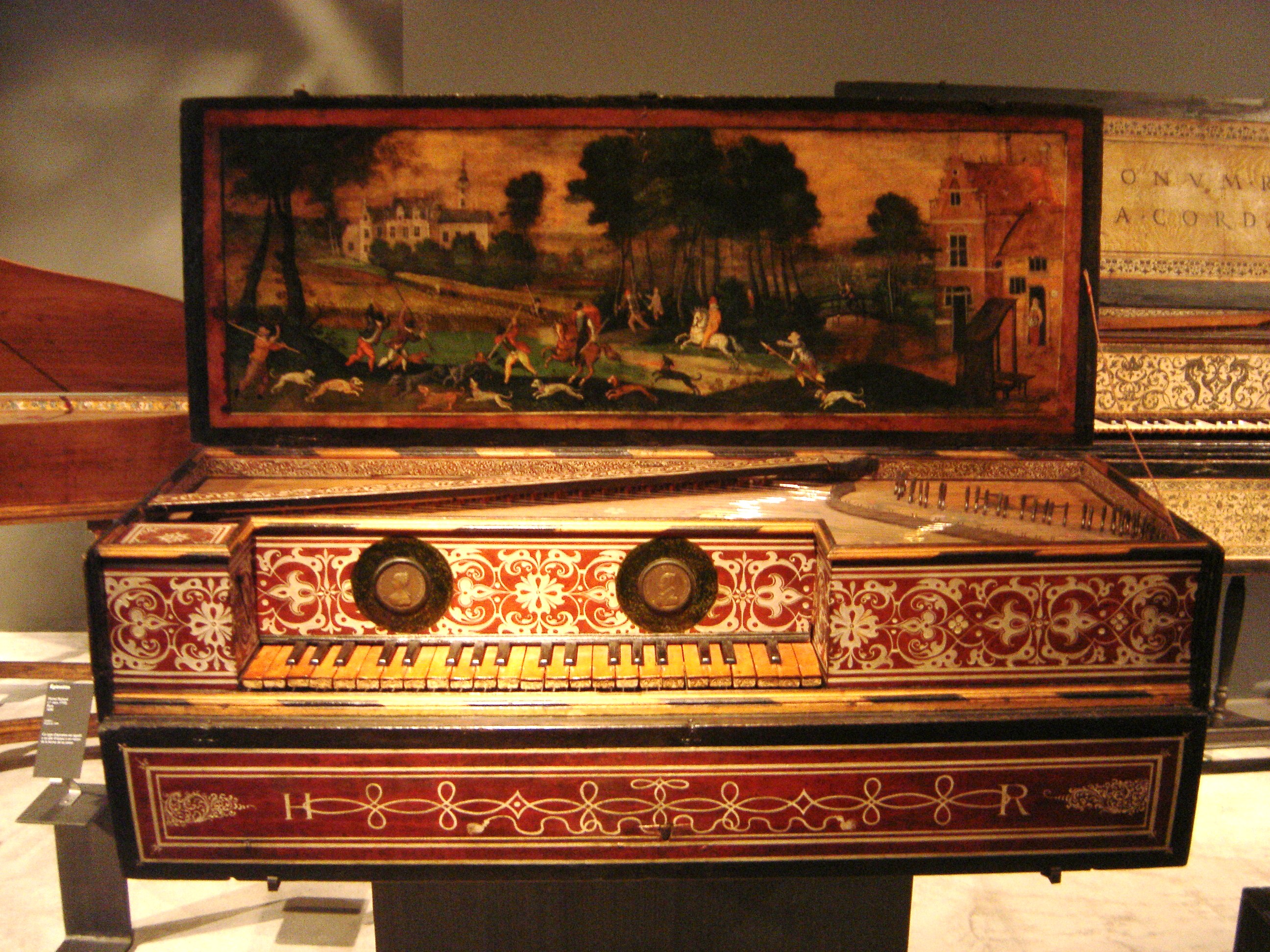
Virginal made by Ruckers

Allman
From the Fitzwilliam Virginal Book. Performed by Ulrich Metzner on a harpsichord of the type used in the early 20th century

The Fitzwilliam Virginal Book is a primary source of keyboard music from the late Elizabethan and early Jacobean periods in England, i.e., the late Renaissance and very early Baroque. It takes its name from Viscount Fitzwilliam who bequeathed this manuscript collection to Cambridge University in 1816. It is now housed in the Fitzwilliam Museum at Cambridge. The word virginals does not necessarily denote any specific instrument and might refer to any instrument with a keyboard.

== History ==
It was given no title by its copyist and the ownership of the manuscript before the eighteenth century is unclear. At the time The Fitzwilliam Virginal Book was put together most collections of keyboard music were compiled by performers and teachers: other examples include Will Forster's Virginal Book, Clement Matchett's Virginal Book, and Anne Cromwell's Virginal Book. It is possible that the complexities of typesetting music precluded the printing of much keyboard music during the late Renaissance and it was not until the advent of engraving music plates that pieces for keyboard were published. The first known example of this in England is Parthenia, which was published in c. 1612.

The FVB was once given the nomenclature of Queen Elizabeth's Virginal Book, although the title cannot be correct since much of its contents were written after her death in 1603. Another hypothesis, which still has supporters, is that it belonged to Francis Tregian the Younger, a recusant and amateur musician. It has been argued that Tregian may have copied the entire collection while imprisoned in the period leading up to his death in 1614. The nature of Tregian's contribution to the book has been disputed. Although other scholarship suggested that, as compiler, it is unlikely that Tregian was imprisoned long enough to undertake the copying involved, a closer inspection of the manuscript reveals two layers of copying, of which nos. 1-95 pieces form the first. This layer might have been done at any time previous to Tregian's 1612 incarceration.

The manuscript includes music dating from approximately 1562 to 1612 by John Bull, William Byrd, Orlando Gibbons, Giles Farnaby (51 of whose 52 known pieces are included), Thomas Tallis, and Martin Peerson. Continental composers are also represented by the English composer in exile Peter Philips, whose music is largely arrangements of sacred music, madrigals and chansons. Other foreign composers are represented by, among others, Jan Pieterszoon Sweelinck, the elusive Jehan Oystermayre and Giovanni Picchi. There are 298 pieces which includes the eighth variation of 'Treg. Ground' (also Hugh Ashton's Ground in My Ladye Nevells Booke) as a separate piece. It is found under a flap on which has written no. 276, 'Pescodd Time' and it is assumed that Tregian either did not recognise the variation or thought it worthy of inclusion; as it happens, it is incomplete. As with many keyboard manuscripts of the time, the pieces were not written for a specific instrument, and most sound happily on all contemporary keyboard instruments, including virginals, harpsichord, clavichord and chamber organ. Many of the pieces in the book are short, and many of them are character pieces with droll and memorable titles, including "Put Up Thy Dagger, Jemy", "The New Sa-Hoo", and "Quodlings Delight" by Giles Farnaby; "Nobody's Gigge", by Richard Farnaby; "Pakington's Pownde" and "The Irishe Dumpe" (anonymous); "The Ghost" and "The Earle of Oxford's Marche" by William Byrd; "Worster Braules" by Thomas Tomkins; and the famous "Lachrymae Pavan" by John Dowland, as arranged by Giles Farnaby and by William Byrd.

In 1899, Breitkopf & Härtel published an edition in two volumes (the Maitland Squire edition, see the Sources below) with only a basic critical commentary, which has been reprinted by Dover Publications and is available inexpensively. A microfilm facsimile of the manuscript is included in The music collections of the Cambridge libraries (Woodbridge, Conn. : Research Publications, 1991). Musica Britannica is preparing a volume dedicated to the "Keyboard Music from Fitzwilliam Manuscripts" . A new three-volume edition was published by Lyrebird Music in 2020, edited by renowned English music scholars Jon Baxendale and Francis Knights.

Richard Strauss used several selections from the Fitzwilliam Virginal Book in his 1935 opera, Die schweigsame Frau, and cited them accordingly at their appearances in the work. They appear at ritualized moments in the action to provide commentary and atmosphere in the Act 2 marriage scene (No. XIV and No. XC) and in the Act 3 courtroom scene (No. XXXVII).

The first recording of selections from the anthology was made by Joseph Payne in 1964. It was issued by Vox Box (i.e. Vox Records) as a three-LP boxed set and features Payne performing three album sides on harpsichord (a modern Eric Herz instrument) and three sides on organ. Generally the more moderately paced and sustained pieces are performed on the organ.

== The pieces in the book ==
(For each composer, the pieces follow the order in which they appear in the manuscript)

=== Anonymous ===
- Alman
- Barafostus' Dreame
- Muscadin
- Alman
- Galiarda
- Praeludium, El. Kidermisters (possibly a work of John Bull)
- Praeludium
- The Irishe Hoe-Hoane
- Veni
- Heavene and Erthe
- [Exercise]
- Praeludium
- Praeludium
- Why Aske Yow
- [deest owing to an error in numbering]
- Pakingtons Pownde (possibly Benjamin Cosyn)
- The Irish Dompe
- Watkins Ale
- Can Shee
- A Toye
- An Almain
- Corranto
- Alman
- Corranto
- Corranto
- Corranto
- Daunce
- Praeludium
- Martin Sayd to his Man
- Coranto
- Corranto
- Corranto
- Corranto
- Corranto
- Alman
- Nowels Galliarde
- The Kynges Morisco
- Alman
- A Toye
- Corranto
- Ladye Riche
- Corranto
- A Toye
- Allemanda
- Dalling Alman

=== Doctor John Bull ===
- Walsingham
- Galliarda to my Lorde Lumlyes Pavan
- Pavana
- Galiarda
- The Quadran Pavan
- Variation of the Quadran Pavan
- Galiard to the Quadran Pavan
- Pavan
- Galiard to the Pavan
- Sainte Thomas Wake
- Praeludium
- Fantasia
- Praeludium
- Gloria tibi trinitas
- Salvator Mundi
- Galliarda
- Variatio
- Galliarda to the Pavan
- In Nomine
- Christe Redemptor
- The Kynges Hunt
- Pavana
- Galiarda
- Dr Bulls Juell
- The Spanyshe Paven
- The Duke of Brunswykes Alman
- Pypers Galiarde
- Variatio ejusdem
- Praeludium
- Galiarda
- Galiarda
- A Gigge, Doctor Bulls My selfe
- A Gigge
- Praeludium
- Ut, re, mi, fa, sol, la
- The Duchesse of Brunswykes Toye
- Miserere in three partes

=== Ferdinando Richardson ===
- Pavana
- Variatio
- Galiarda
- Variation
- Pavane
- Variatio
- Galiarda
- Variatio

=== Giles Farnaby ===
- Pavana (Robert Johnson set by Giles Farnaby)
- The K[ing's] Hunt
- Spagnioletta
- For tow virginals
- Daphne
- Pawles Wharfe
- Quodlings Deligte
- Putte upp thy Dagger, Jemy
- Bony sweete Robin
- Fantasia
- Wooddy Cocke
- Rosasolis
- Alman (Robert Johnson set by Giles Farnaby)
- The Nuwe Sa-Hoo
- Giles Farnabyes Dreame
- His Rest
- His Humoure
- A Maske
- A Maske
- Fantasia
- A Maske
- Fantasia
- Loth to departe
- Fantasia
- Fantasia
- Ay me, poore Heart
- Fantasia
- Walter Erles Pavan
- The L. Zouches Maske
- Grownde
- Upp T[ails] all
- Tower Hill
- Praeludium
- A Gigge
- Galliarda
- A Toye
- Farnabyes Conceite
- Telle Mee, Daphne
- Mal Sims
- Rosseters Galiarde
- The Flatt Pavan
- Why aske yow
- Farmers Pavan
- The Olde Spagnoletta
- Meridian Alman
- Fantasia

=== John Munday ===
- Fantasia
- Fantasia, Faire Wether, etc.
- Robin
- Go from my window
- Mundays Joye

=== Peter Philips ===
- Tirsi, di Luca Marenzio. Ia. Parte intavolata di Pietro Phillipi.
- Freno
- Cosi morirò
- Fece da voi
- Pavana Pagget
- Galiarda
- Passamezzo Pavana
- Galiarda passamezzo
- Chi fara fede al Cielo, di Alessandro Striggio
- Bon Jour mon Cueur, di Orlando di Lasso
- Pavana Dolorosa, Treg[ian set by]
- Galiarda Dolorosa
- Amarilli, di Julio Romano (Giulio Caccini)
- Margott laborez
- Fantasia (Si me tenez, Thomas Crecquillon).
- Pavana
- Le Rossignuol, (Lasso set by)
- Galliardo
- Fantasia

=== Thomas Morley ===
- Goe from my window
- Nancie
- Fantasia
- Alman
- La Volta (Set by William Byrd)
- Pavana
- Galiarda

=== Thomas Tomkins ===
- Pavana
- A Grownde
- Barafostus' Dreame
- The Hunting Galliard
- Worster Braules

=== William Byrd ===
BK numbers refer to Musica Britannica: William Byrd Keyboard Music, ed. Alan Brown (London: Stainer & Bell, 2 vols, 1969/71)

- 8. Fantasia, BK63
- 10. Jhon come kisse me nowe, BK81
- 24. Praeludium, BK24
- 52. Fantasia, BK13
- 56. Passamezzo Pavana, BK2a
- 57. Galliardas Passamezzo, BK2b
- 58. The Carmans Whistle, BK36 (also catalogued in My Ladye Nevells Booke)
- 59. The Huntes upp, BK40 (also catalogued in My Ladye Nevells Booke)
- 61. Treg[ian's] Grownde, BK20
- 61(sic.) Monsieurs Alman (I), BK87
- 62. Variatio, BK88
- 63. [Monsieur's] Alman [III], BK44
- 64. Sellengers Rownde, BK84 (also catalogued in My Ladye Nevells Booke)
- 65. Fortune, BK6
- 66. O Mistris Myne, BK83
- 67. Will Yow Walke the Woods soe Wylde, BK85 (also catalogued in My Ladye Nevells Booke)
- 68. Have With Yow to Walsingame, BK8 (also catalogued in My Ladye Nevells Booke)
- 69. The Bells, BK38
- 91. Pavana, Bray, BK59a
- 92. Galiarda, BK59b
- 93. Pavana, Ph. Tr., BK60a
- 94. Galiarda, BK60b
- 100. Praeludium to the Fancie, BK12
- 101. Ut, Re, Mi, Fa, Sol, La, BK64 (also catalogued in My Ladye Nevells Booke)
- 102. Ut, Re, Mi, BK65
- 103. Fantasia
- 104. All in a Garden Grine, BK56
- 121. Pavana Lachrymae, BK54 (by John Dowland, set by William Byrd)
- 122. Galiarda, BK55 (by James Harding, set by Byrd)
- 126. The Maydens Songe, BK82
- 133. The Quadran Pavian, BK70a
- 134. Galiarde to the Quadran Pavian, BK70b
- 150. Malt's come downe, BK107 (doubtful attribution)
- 155. La Volta, BK91
- 156. An Almane, BK89
- 157. Wolsey's Wylde, BK37
- 158. Callino Casturame, BK35
- 159. La Volta L. Morley, BK90
- 160. Rowland (Lord Willobies welcome home), BK7 (also catalogued in My Ladye Nevells Booke)
- 162. The Goste, BK78
- 163. Alman, BK11
- 164. Galliard, BK53
- 165. Pavana, BK4a
- 166. Galiarda, BK4b
- 167. [The first] Pavana, BK29a (also catalogued in My Ladye Nevells Booke)
- 168. Galiarda, BK29b (also catalogued in My Ladye Nevells Booke)
- 172. The Queene's Alman, BK10
- 173. A Medley, BK111 (attribution doubtful)
- 174. Pavana
- 175. Galliarda
- 176. Miserere [Clarifica me pater] in three partes, BK48
- 177. Miserere [Clarifica me pater] in fore partes, BK49
- 181. A Gigg, 'F.Tr.', BK22
- 191. Sir Jhon Grayes Galliarde, BK104 (doubtful attribution)
- 216. Gipsies Rownde, BK80
- 218. [The French] Coranto, BK21a
- 241. Corranto, BK45
- 252. [The third] Pavana, BK14a (also catalogued in My Ladye Nevells Booke)
- 253. Galiarda, BK14b (also catalogued in My Ladye Nevells Booke)
- 254. Pavana, BK52a
- 255. Galiarda, BK52b
- 256. Pavana, BK101 (doubtful attribution)
- 257. [The second] Pavana Fant[asia], BK71a (also catalogued in My Ladye Nevells Booke)
- 258. Galiarda, BK71b (also catalogued in My Ladye Nevells Booke)
- 259 The Earle of Oxford's Marche [The march before the Battell], BK93 (also catalogued in My Ladye Nevells Booke)
- 261. Fantasia, BK62
- 275. Pavana, Canon 2 in 1,
- 276. Pescodd Tyme [The Hunt's Up], BK40
- 277. Pavana deligte (Edward Johnson, set by William Byrd), BK5a
- 278. Galiarda (Edward Johnson, set by William Byrd), BK5b
- 294. Ladye Montegles Pavan, BK75

=== William Tisdall ===
- Almand
- Pavana Chromatica
- Pavana, Clement Cotton
- Pavana
- Galiarda

=== The Other Pieces ===
- Pavana - M. S.
- The Woods so Wilde - Orlando Gibbons
- Praeludium - Thomas Oldfield
- In Nomine - William Blitheman (see John Blitheman)
- Fantasia - Nicholas Strogers
- Alman - Nicholas Strogers
- Toccata - Giovanni Picchi
- Praeludium, Toccata - Jan Pieterszoon Sweelinck
- Pavana - Thomas Warrock (see also organists of Hereford Cathedral)
- Galiarda - Thomas Warrock
- Praeludium - Galeazzo
- Heavene and Erthe - Fre - Francis Tregian
- Felix namque 1 - Thomas Tallis
- Felix namque 2 - Thomas Tallis
- Felix namque: Alleluia (possibly a Thomas Tallis sketch); in Breitkopf, it has no title; elsewhere, it is called 'Præludium'.
- Ut, Re, Mi, Fa, Sol, La a 4 voci - Jan Pieterszoon Sweelinck
- Pavana Lachrymae - John Dowland (set by William Byrd)
- Galiarda - James Harding (set by William Byrd)
- In Nomine - John Parsons
- Psalme - Jan Pieterszoon Sweelinck
- Nobodyes Gigge - Richard Farnaby (son of Giles Farnaby)
- Pipers Pavan - Martin Peerson
- Allemanda - Marchant
- Fayne would I Wedd - Richard Farnaby
- Fantasia - Jan Pieterzoon Sweelinck
- Alman - Hooper (perhaps Edmund Hooper)
- Corranto - Hooper
- Jhonsons Medley - Edward Johnson
- A Galiarde Grownde - William Inglott (organist at Hereford and Norwich Cathedrals)
- The Leaves bee greene - William Inglott
- Galiarda - Jehan Oystermayre
- The Primerose - Martin Peerson
- The Fall of the Leafe - Martin Peerson
- Pavana Delight - Edward Johnson (set by William Byrd)
- Lachrymae Pavan - John Dowland (set by Giles Farnaby)
- Pavana - Orlando Gibbons
- Hanskin - Richard Farnaby

== See also ==
- The Mulliner Book
- The Dublin Virginal Manuscript
- My Ladye Nevells Booke
- Susanne van Soldt Manuscript
- Clement Matchett's Virginal Book
- Parthenia
- Priscilla Bunbury's Virginal Book
- Elizabeth Rogers' Virginal Book
- Anne Cromwell's Virginal Book
- Francis Tregian the Younger
