= Jan Pieterszoon Sweelinck =

Dutch Renaissance composer (1562–1621

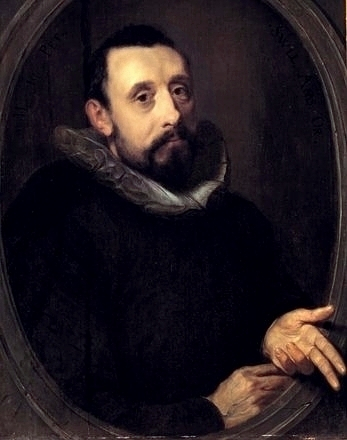
- Portrait of Sweelinck from 1606
- Born: April or May 1562; Deventer, Netherlands
- Died: 16 October 1621 (aged 59); Amsterdam, Netherlands
- Occupations: Composer, organist, pedagogue
- Era: Renaissance, Baroque
- Spouse: Claesgen Dircxdochter Puyner (m. 1590)

Jan Pieterszoon Sweelinck (/ˈjɑːn ˈpiːtərsoʊn ˈsweɪlɪŋk/ YAHN PEE-tər-sohn SWAY-link; April or May 1562 – 16 October 1621) was a Dutch composer, organist, and pedagogue whose work straddled the end of the Renaissance and beginning of the Baroque eras. He was among the first major keyboard composers of Europe, and his work as a teacher helped establish the north German organ tradition.

== Life ==
Sweelinck was born in Deventer, Netherlands, in April or May 1562. He was the eldest son of organist Peter (or Pieter) Swybbertszoon and Elske Jansdochter Sweeling, daughter of a surgeon. Soon after Sweelinck's birth, the family moved to Amsterdam, where from about 1564, Pieter Swybbertszoon served as organist of the Oude Kerk (Sweelinck's paternal grandfather and uncle also were organists). Jan Pieterszoon must have received first lessons in music from his father. Unfortunately, his father died in 1573. He subsequently received general education under Jacob Buyck, Catholic pastor of the Oude Kerk (these lessons stopped in 1578 after the Reformation of Amsterdam and the subsequent conversion to Calvinism; Buyck chose to leave the city). Little is known about his music education after the death of his father; his music teachers may have included Jan Willemszoon Lossy, a little-known countertenor and shawm player at Haarlem, and/or Cornelis Boskoop, Sweelinck's father's successor at the Oude Kerk. If Sweelinck indeed studied in Haarlem, he was probably influenced to some degree by the organists of St.-Bavokerk, Claas Albrechtszoon van Wieringen and Floris van Adrichem, both of whom improvised daily in the Bavokerk.

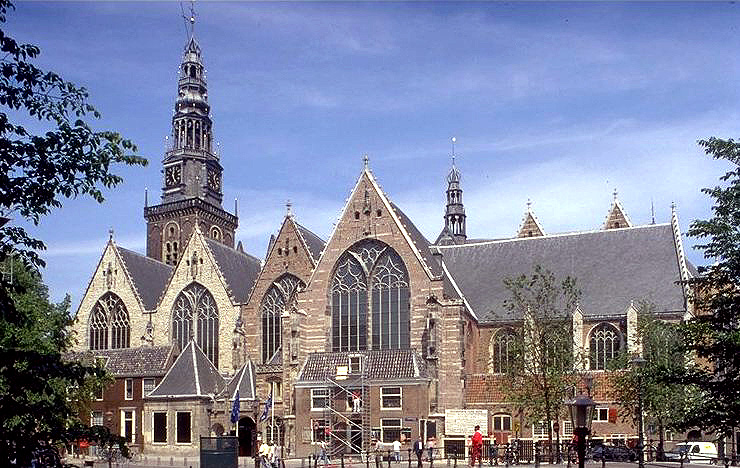
Oude Kerk, the Amsterdam church where Sweelinck worked almost his entire life.

According to Cornelis Plemp, a pupil and friend of Sweelinck's, he started his 44-year career as organist of the Oude Kerk in 1577, when he was 15. This date, however, is uncertain, because the church records from 1577 to 1580 are missing and Sweelinck can only be traced in Oude Kerk from 1580 onwards; he occupied the post for the rest of his life. Sweelinck's widowed mother died in 1585, and Jan Pieterszoon took responsibility for his younger brother and sister. His salary of 100 florins was doubled the next year, presumably to help matters. In addition, he was offered an additional 100 guilders in the event that he married, which happened in 1590 when he married Claesgen Dircxdochter Puyner from Medemblik. He was also offered the choice between a further 100 guilders and free accommodations in a house belonging to the town, the latter of which he chose. Sweelinck's first published works date from around 1592–94: three volumes of chansons, the last of which is the only remaining volume published in 1594 (for reasons that are not certain, the composer adopted his mother's last name; "Sweelinck" first appears on the title-page of the 1594 publication). Sweelinck then set to publishing psalm settings, aiming to set the entire Psalter. These works appeared in four large volumes published in 1604, 1613, 1614 and 1621. The last volume was published posthumously and, presumably, in unfinished form. Sweelinck died of unknown causes on 16 October 1621 and was buried in the Oude Kerk. He was survived by his wife and five of their six children; the eldest of them, Dirck Janszoon, succeeded his father as organist of the Oude Kerk.

The composer most probably spent his entire life in Amsterdam, only occasionally visiting other cities in connection with his professional activities: he was asked to inspect organs, give opinions and advice on organ building and restoration, etc. These duties resulted in short visits to Delft, Dordrecht (1614), Enkhuizen, Haarlem (1594), Harderwijk (1608), Middelburg (1603), Nijmegen (1605), Rotterdam (1610), Rhenen (1616), as well as Deventer, his birthplace (1595, 1616). Sweelinck's longest voyage was to Antwerp in 1604, when he was commissioned by the Amsterdam authorities to buy a harpsichord for the city. No documentary evidence has turned up to support the tradition, going back to Mattheson, that Sweelinck visited Venice – perhaps a confusion with his brother, the painter Gerrit Pietersz Sweelink, who did – and similarly there is no evidence that he ever crossed the English Channel, although copies of his music did such as the pieces included in the Fitzwilliam Virginal Book. His popularity as a composer, performer and teacher increased steadily during his lifetime. Contemporaries nicknamed him Orpheus of Amsterdam and even the city authorities frequently brought important visitors to hear Sweelinck's improvisations.

== Works ==
Variations on Mein junges Leben hat ein End'
Performed by Matthias Flierl

Variations on Est-ce Mars
Performed by Ashtar Moïra

Sweelinck represents the highest development of the Dutch keyboard school, and indeed represented a pinnacle in keyboard contrapuntal complexity and refinement before J.S. Bach. However, he was a skilled composer for voices as well, and composed more than 250 vocal works (chansons, madrigals, motets and Psalms).

Some of Sweelinck's innovations were of profound musical importance, including the fugue—he was the first to write an organ fugue which began simply, with one subject, successively adding texture and complexity until a final climax and resolution. It is also generally thought that many of Sweelinck's keyboard works were intended as studies for his pupils. He was also the first to use the pedal as a real fugal part. Stylistically Sweelinck's music also brings together the richness, complexity and spatial sense of Andrea and Giovanni Gabrieli, and the ornamentation and intimate forms of the English virginalists. In some of his works Sweelinck appears as a composer of the Baroque style, with the exception of his chansons which mostly resemble the French Renaissance tradition. In formal development, especially in the use of countersubject, stretto, and organ point (pedal point), his music could be said to resemble Bach (who was quite possibly familiar with Sweelinck’s music).

Sweelinck was a master improviser, and acquired the informal title of the "Orpheus of Amsterdam". More than 70 of his keyboard works have survived, and many of them may be similar to the improvisations that residents of Amsterdam around 1600 were likely to have heard. In the course of his life, Sweelinck was involved with the musical liturgies of three distinctly different traditions: Catholic, the Calvinist, and Lutheran—all of which are reflected in his work. Even his vocal music, which is more conservative than his keyboard writing, shows a striking rhythmic complexity and an unusual richness of contrapuntal devices.

== Influence ==
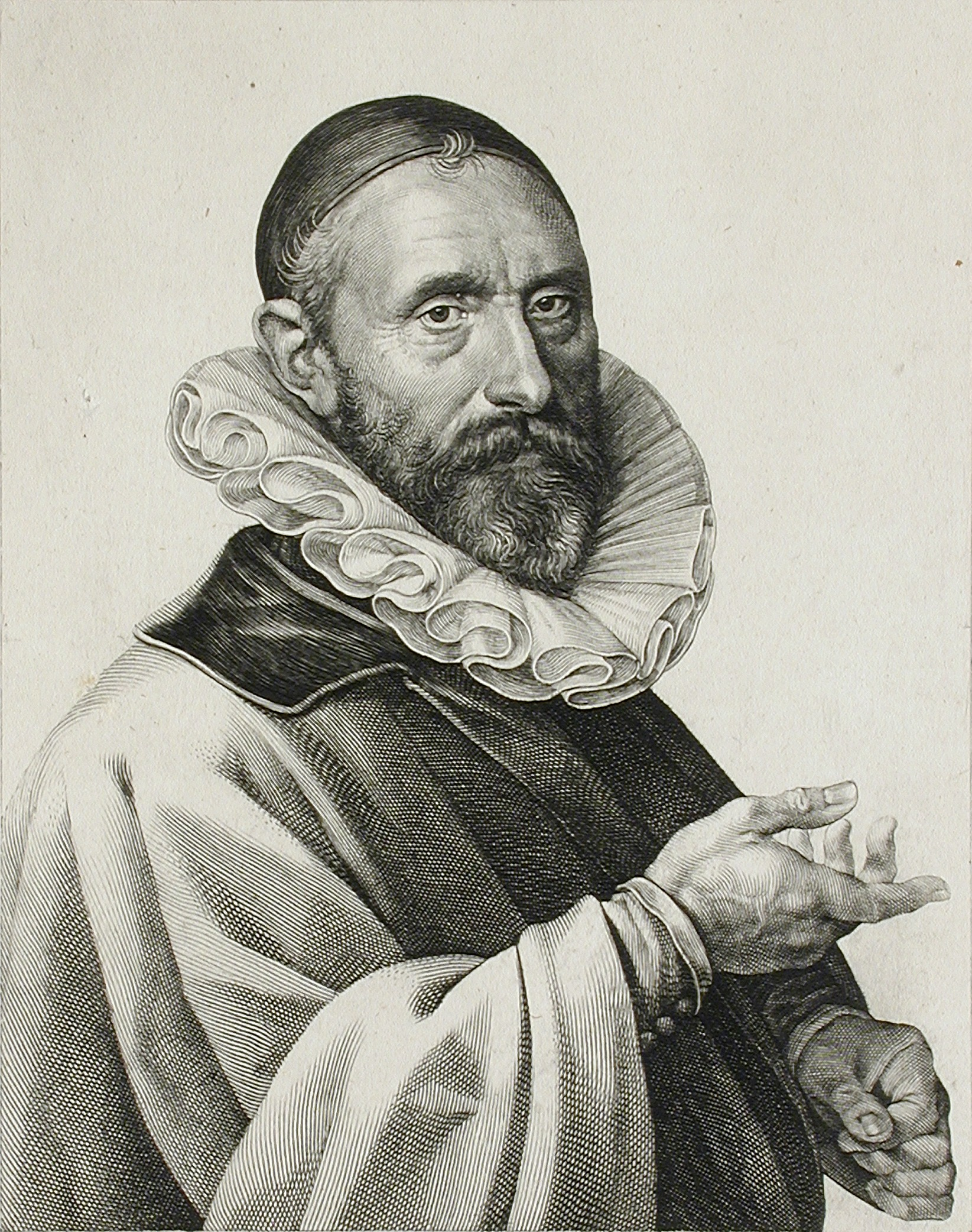
A 1624 portrait of Sweelinck, engraved by Jan Harmensz. Muller.

Sweelinck's only duties in Amsterdam were those of an organist. Contrary to custom, he did not play the carillon or the harpsichord on formal occasions, nor was he regularly required to produce compositions. Calvinist services did not typically include organ playing due to the belief in what is now called the Regulative Principle. The Regulative Principle restricted the elements of worship to only that which was commanded in the New Testament. However, the Consistory of Dordrecht of 1598 instructed organists to play variations on the new Genevan psalm tunes before and after the service so that the people would become familiar with them. Sweelinck was employed instead by the city itself. As he worked for Protestant magistrates the remainder of his life, it is likely that he was an adherent of Calvinism. In the 1590s three of his children were baptized in the Oude Kerk. His employment allowed him time for teaching, for which he was to become as famous as for his compositions. Sweelinck's pupils included the core of what was to become the north German organ school: Jacob Praetorius II, Heinrich Scheidemann, Paul Siefert, Melchior Schildt and Samuel and Gottfried Scheidt. Students of Sweelinck were seen as musicians against whom other organists were measured. Sweelinck was known in Germany as the "maker of organists". Sociable and respected, he was in great demand as a teacher. His Dutch pupils were undoubtedly many, but none of them became composers of note. Sweelinck, however, influenced the development of the Dutch organ school, as is shown in the work of later composers such as Anthoni van Noordt. Sweelinck, in the course of his career, had set music to Catholic, Calvinist and Lutheran liturgies. He was the most important composer of the musically rich "golden era" of the Netherlands.

Sweelinck's influence spread as far as Sweden and England, carried to the former by Andreas Düben and to the latter by English composers such as Peter Philips, who probably met Sweelinck in 1593. Sweelinck, and Dutch composers in general, had evident links to the English school of composition. Sweelinck's music appears in the Fitzwilliam Virginal Book, which otherwise only contains the work of English composers. He wrote variations on John Dowland's famous Lachrimae Pavane. John Bull, who was probably a personal friend, wrote a set of variations on a theme by Sweelinck after the death of the Dutch composer.

== Scores ==
- A scholarly edition of Sweelinck's works has been published in the Netherlands in the years from 1974 to 1990, in 7 volumes (some of them divided in fascicles) with editors' notes in English: Jan Pieterszoon Sweelinck: Opera Omnia / Editio altera quam edendam curavit Vereniging voor Nederlandse Muziekgeschiedenis (2nd revised edition edited by Gustav Leonhardt, Alfons Annegarn, Frits Noske & al.), Amsterdam, VNM [Royal Dutch Society for Musicology], 1974–1990
- A new scholarly edition of Sweelinck's complete keyboard works (Breitkopf & Härtel, 2004) is edited in 4 volumes by Harald Vogel and Pieter Dirksen.

== Recordings ==
- Complete Keyboard Works. Various organists and harpsichordists. NM Classics 92119 (9 CDs)
- Het Sweelinck Monument, a complete recording of the vocal works of Sweelinck; The Gesualdo Consort Amsterdam conducted by Harry van der Kamp, Glossa, (17 CDs), 2009–2010. The recordings were simultaneously issued on CD and also available in Dutch language book-CD presentation sets in the Netherlands.

== See also ==
- List of students of Jan Pieterszoon Sweelinck
