= John Bull (composer) =

English composer and organist (1562/63–1628)

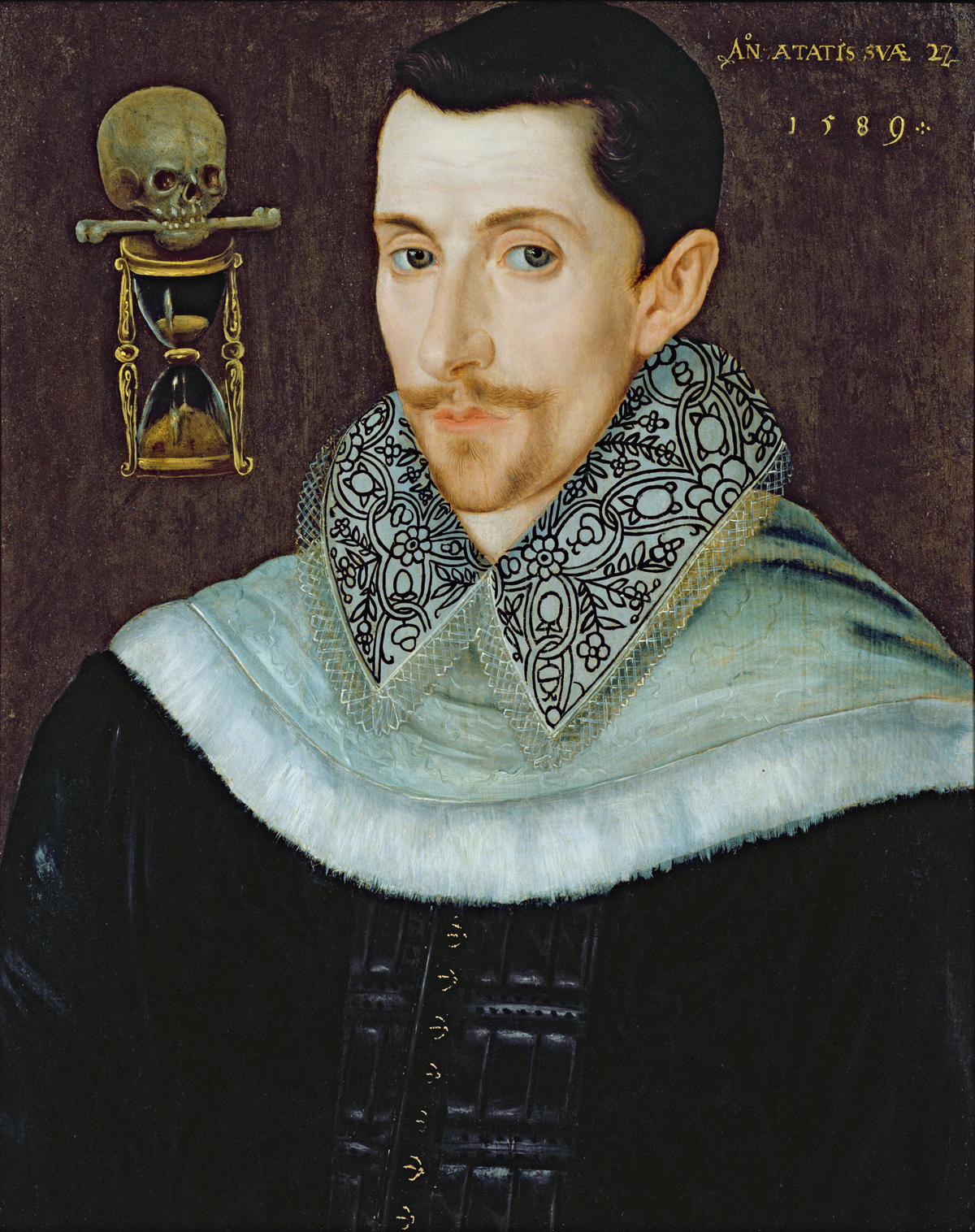
John Bull in c. 1589, portrait kept at the Bate Collection of Musical Instruments

John Bull (1562/63 – 12/13 March 1628) was an English composer, organist, virginalist and organ builder. He was a renowned keyboard performer of the virginalist school and most of his compositions were written for this medium.

== Life and career ==
Bull's place of birth is uncertain. In an article published in 1952, Thurston Dart presumed that Bull's family originated in Somerset, in line with the view of the 17th-century antiquarian Anthony Wood who proposed specifically that he was related to the Bull family of Peglich, Somerset. In 1959 Dart proposed alternatively that Bull was probably the son of a London goldsmith…; then, in the second edition of his Calendar of the Life of John Bull, Dart proposed Hereford as a third possibility. More recent research by Susi Jeans suggests that Bull was born in the Radnorshire parish of Old Radnor within the Diocese of Hereford, although no birth records have yet been discovered. Bull's appointment as organist of Hereford Cathedral in 1582 lends credence to this diocese being his place of birth: it was customary at this time for organists to return to their home cathedrals after training in London (cf. Thomas Morley).

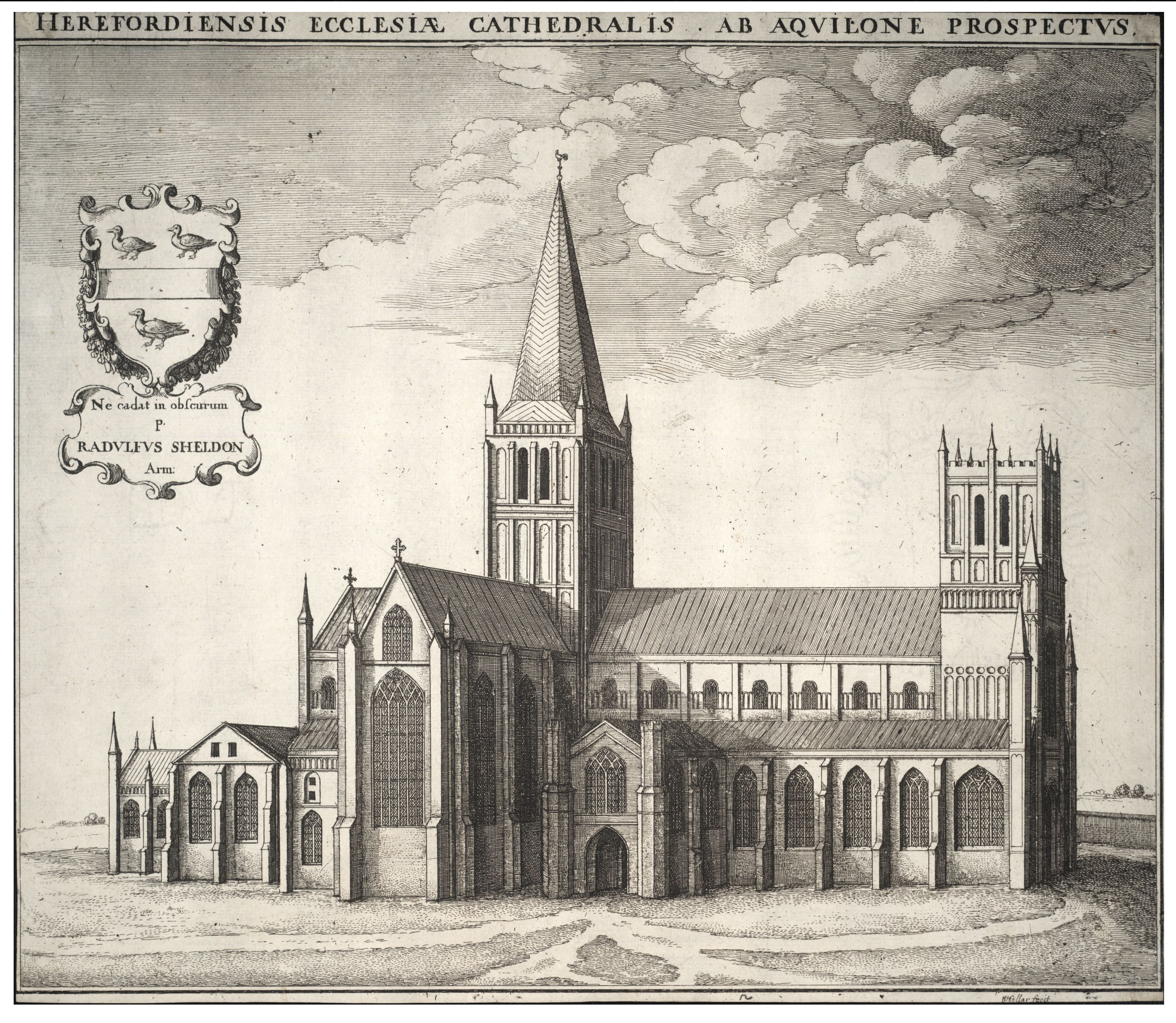
Hereford Cathedral, 17th-century engraving

In 1573 he joined the choir at Hereford Cathedral, and the next year joined the Children of the Chapel Royal in London, where he studied with John Blitheman and William Hunnis; he also learned to play the organ at this time. After being appointed to the Merchant Taylor's Company in 1577–78, Bull received his first appointment as organist of Hereford Cathedral in 1582, and then became Master of the Children there.

In 1586 he received his degree from Oxford, and he became a Gentleman of the Chapel Royal that same year. In 1591, following the death of John Blitheman, he became organist at the Chapel Royal; in 1592 he received his doctorate from Oxford, and in 1596 he became the first professor of music at Gresham College on the recommendation of Queen Elizabeth, who admired him. There is some evidence that she sent Bull on espionage missions: his eighteen-month trip to the continent in 1601–02, ostensibly for health reasons, has never been satisfactorily explained, and his whereabouts there, apart from a visit to Brussels, then in the Spanish Netherlands, remain a mystery. On the death of Elizabeth, he entered into the service of King James, establishing a reputation as a skilled composer, keyboard performer and improviser.

In 1597, Bull's appointment to Gresham College assigned him rooms at Gresham House which were occupied by Thomas Gresham's stepson, William Reade. Fearful of losing his readership due to being unable to lodge there, Bull forced an entry to the rooms by engaging a mason to help him break down a wall, which led to an action against Bull in Star Chamber. The outcome of this case is not known. Ten years later, he was forced to leave his post at Gresham College on 20 December 1607, after he fathered a child pre-maritally with an Elizabeth Walter, thus losing his best source of income as well as his quarters. Even though he filed a petition for a marriage licence two days after he lost his job, he never returned to the college. He married Elizabeth Walter in 1607, by whom he had a daughter.

Just after publishing seven keyboard pieces in Parthenia, Bull left England for good, secretly and with great haste in October 1613. His salary at the Chapel Royal was paid in lieu to Edmund Hooper. Bull was fleeing the wrath of George Abbot, Archbishop of Canterbury, and King James himself; the charge this time was adultery. William Trumbull, the English envoy in the Low Countries, after first attempting to cover for him – but later fearing for his own position if he continued to do so – wrote to the King in early 1614:

Bull did not leave your Majesties service for any wrong done unto him, or for matter of religion, under which fained pretext he now sought to wrong the reputation of your Majesties justice, but did in that dishonest matter steal out of England through the guilt of a corrupt conscience, to escape the punishment, which notoriously he had deserved, and was designed to have been inflicted on him by the hand of justice, for his incontinence, fornication, adultery, and other grievious crimes.

The Archbishop of Canterbury had said of him the previous year: "the man hath more music than honesty and is as famous for marring of virginity as he is for fingering of organs and virginals." The archbishop described the case to Trumbull; Bull slept in a bed with his wife and two maidservants slept in a truckle bed underneath. One summer morning Bull made one of the maids take his place by his wife, while he slept with the other maid in the truckle bed. Bull had also assaulted a church minister in front of the congregation.

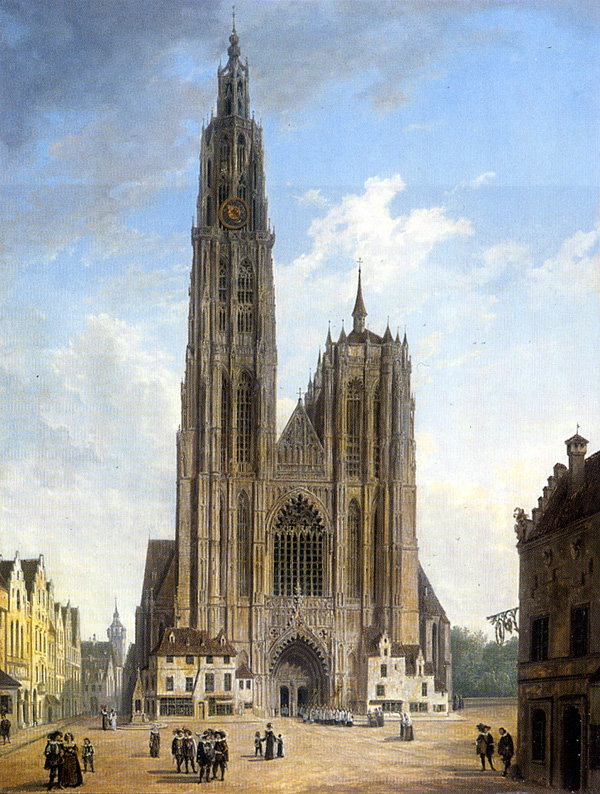
Antwerp Cathedral, painted c. 1820 by Domenico Quaglio the Younger. Bull worked as organist of the cathedral from 1615 until his death.

Bull remained in Flanders, where it seems he stayed out of trouble. He was briefly employed at the Brussels court, but was released after Trumbull communicated King James's displeasure; he continued to receive money from the court until 1618. In 1615 Antwerp Cathedral appointed him as assistant organist, and as principal organist in 1617. Bull wrote a series of letters while in Flanders, including one to the mayor of Antwerp, claiming that the reason he left England was to escape religious persecution. Although there is no evidence that he was a Catholic, he wrote, somewhat ambiguously

how, in the month of October in the year 1613 he was forced to take flight thence hither, since information had been laid against him that he was of the Catholic faith, and that he could not acknowledge His Majesty as head of the Church. Which is a capital offence there.

He seems to have been believed, for he was never extradited back to England in spite of Trumbull's complaining to the Archduke. While in Antwerp he most probably met Jan Pieterszoon Sweelinck, the most influential keyboard composer of the age.

In the 1620s he continued his career as an organist, organ builder and consultant. He died in Antwerp and was buried on 15 March 1628 in the cemetery next to the cathedral.

== Works ==
Bull was one of the most famous composers of keyboard music of the early 17th century, exceeded only by Jan Pieterszoon Sweelinck in the Netherlands, Girolamo Frescobaldi in Italy, and, some would say, by his countryman and elder, the celebrated William Byrd. He left many compositions for keyboard, some of which were collected in the Fitzwilliam Virginal Book.

His first (and only) publication, in 1612 or 1613, was a contribution of seven pieces forming part of a collection of virginal music entitled Parthenia, or the Maydenhead of the First Musicke That Ever Was Printed for the Virginalls, dedicated to the 15-year-old Princess Elizabeth, who was his student, on the occasion of her betrothal to Frederick V, Elector Palatine of the Rhine. The other contributors to Parthenia were Bull's contemporaries William Byrd and Orlando Gibbons, among the most famous composers of the age. Bull also wrote an anthem, God the father, God the son, for the wedding in 1613 of the princess and the Elector Palatine.

In addition to his keyboard compositions, he wrote verse anthems, canons and other works.

His 5-part anthem Almighty God, which by the Leading of a Star, known colloquially as the Star Anthem, was the most popular Jacobean verse anthem, occurring in more contemporary sources than any other.

Much of his music was lost when he fled England; some was destroyed, and some was stolen by other composers, though occasionally such misattributions can be corrected today based on stylistic grounds. One of the most unusual collections of music from the period is his book of 120 canons, an astonishing display of contrapuntal skill. Of the 120 canons, 116 are based on the Miserere. Techniques employed to transform the simple theme include diminution, augmentation, retrograde and mixed time signatures. Some of his music in the Fitzwilliam Virginal Book is of a lighter character and uses whimsical titles: "A Battle and No Battle," "Bonny Peg of Ramsey," "The King's Hunt," and "Bull's Good-Night."

Bull is often credited, falsely, as the composer of "God Save the King", the national and/or royal anthem of a number of Commonwealth realms, their territories, and the Crown Dependencies.

== See also ==
- List of Gresham Professors of Music

== Sources ==
- Susi Jeans, "John Bull". The New Grove Dictionary of Music and Musicians, ed. Stanley Sadie. 20 vols. London: Macmillan Publishers Ltd., 1980. ISBN 1-56159-174-2
- The Concise Edition of Baker's Biographical Dictionary of Musicians, 8th ed. Revised by Nicolas Slonimsky. New York: Schirmer Books, 1993. ISBN 0-02-872416-X
- Manfred Bukofzer, Music in the Baroque Era. New York, W.W. Norton & Co., 1947. ISBN 0-393-09745-5
- Leigh Henry, Dr John Bull: 1562–1628. [London]: Herbert Joseph Ltd, in association with the Globe-Mermaid Association, 1937. Reprinted, Da Capo Press Music Reprint Series. New York: Da Capo Press, 1968.
- Walker Cunningham, The Keyboard Music of John Bull. Studies in Musicology 71. Ann Arbor: UMI Research Press, 1984. ISBN 0-8357-1466-7
- John Bull: Keyboard Music. Edited by John Steele & Francis Cameron, with additional material by Thurston Dart. Stainer & Bell, London 1967. 2 vols.
- Neighbour, Oliver; Jeans, Susi (2001). "Bull [Boul, Bul, Bol], John". Grove Music Online. Oxford: Oxford University Press. doi:10.1093/gmo/9781561592630.article.04294. ISBN 978-1-56159-263-0. (subscription, Wikilibrary access, or UK public library membership required)
- Pieter Dirksen, "Towards a canon of the keyboard music of John Bull", in: Aspects of Early English Keyboard Music to c.1630, ed. David J. Smith (Ashgate Historical Keyboard Series, Oxon/New York: Routledge, 2019), S. 184–206.
