= Priscilla Bunbury's Virginal Book =

Priscilla Bunbury's Virginal Book is a musical commonplace book compiled in the late 1630s by two young women from an affluent Cheshire family. It is important more for its fingering indications than for the quality of the music it contains.

== The manuscript ==
The manuscript is an upright volume measuring 11.5 inches by 8 inches in a tooled leather binding. The front cover bears the words PRISCILLA BVNBURY in tooled lettering, and the back cover the initials PB. It contains thirty two-pages pre-ruled with six-line staves. There are thirty-five neatly written pieces of music, but the first and last pages, together with the pieces they bore, are missing. Apart from the music, there is a medicinal recipe and other scribblings. At least two different hands can be discerned. As of 2001, the manuscript was in a private collection in England.

== The authors ==
The first owner of the book was Priscilla Bunbury (1615–1682), daughter of Sir Henry Bunbury of Little Stanney in Cheshire and his second wife Martha. The second owner was also a Priscilla Bunbury (c. 1675 – after 1707), daughter of Sir Thomas Bunbury, a grandson of Sir Henry and his first wife, and goddaughter of the first Priscilla.

== Contents ==
Five pieces are attributed to Robert Hall, of whom nothing is known. Five are by Orlando Gibbons, and three by Randall Jewett, a member of the choir at Chester Cathedral and brother of the better-known Randolph Jewett, possibly a pupil of Orlando Gibbons. The entire "Battle" sequence by William Byrd is included as one piece (also found in My Ladye Nevells Booke). Twenty one of the pieces are not attributed.

1. [Untitled] Whoop, do me no harm, good man (Orlando Gibbons)
2. The White Ribbin
3. The freind's [sic] Good Night
4. The Celebran (Orlando Gibbons)
5. A jig
6. Put up thy dagger Jemmy (unattributed, but also found in the Fitzwilliam Virginal Book by Giles Farnaby)
7. Money is a Gallant thinge
8. Rappaks jig
9. The maukin
10. George
11. La holland
12. Mrs Prissilla Bunburie hir Delight
13. Almaine Mr Gibbons (Orlando Gibbons)
14. [Untitled] (Randall Jewett)
15. A maske (Orlando Gibbons)
16. Berchen Greene Hollan
17. A french Lesson
18. Swinnertons Almaine
19. A Maske
20. A Coranto
21. The Buildings
22. Churtons farwell (Randall Jewett)
23. Almaine (Randall Jewett)
24. Grayes Inn Maske (Orlando Gibbons)
25. The new Rant
26. The parson of the parrish
27. Captaine owens Delight
28. A horne pipe (Robert Hall)
29. The battle by mr:bird (William Byrd): The soldiers sumons [sic]: The foote march: The horse march: The trumpetts: Irish march: Bagpipe: fife and drum: march to the fighte: Tantara: [untitled]: [untitled]: The bells. (Also found in My Ladye Nevells Booke and Elizabeth Rogers' Virginal Book)
30. The buildinge
31. Frogg gall[iard] (Robert Hall)
32. The pleasing widdow (Robert Hall)
33. Mock widdow (Robert Hall)
34. My choyce is made and I desire no change. My choyce (Robert Hall)
35. The Nightingaill

== The fingering ==
Pieces 1-28, corresponding to the hand of the first Priscilla Bunbury, contain full fingering indications. As far as the right hand is concerned, these follow the modern system, with the thumb numbered "1" and the little finger "5". The system is however reversed for the left hand, where the little finger is numbered "1" and the thumb "5". It is evident that the author favoured the use of the third finger for the right hand and the third finger and thumb for the left hand on "strong" notes.
