= My Ladye Nevells Booke =

1591 manuscript by William Byrd

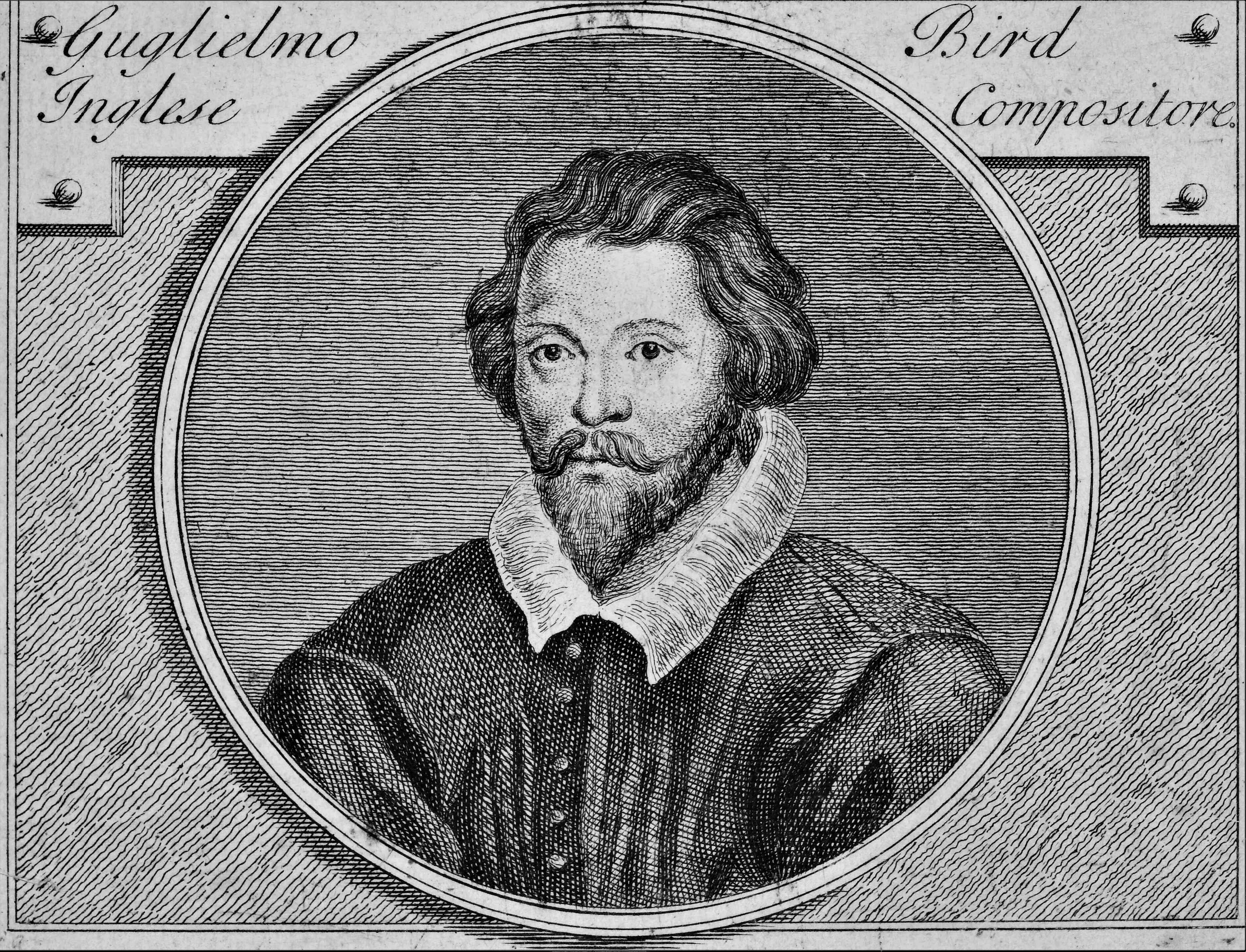
An etching of William Byrd

My Ladye Nevells Booke (British Library MS Mus. 1591) is a music manuscript containing keyboard pieces by the English composer William Byrd, and, together with the Fitzwilliam Virginal Book, one of the most important collections of English Renaissance keyboard music.

== Description ==
My Ladye Nevells Booke consists of 42 pieces for keyboard by William Byrd, widely considered one of the greatest English composers of his time. Although the music was copied by John Baldwin, a singing man from St George's Chapel, Windsor Castle, who was also paid for copying music at the chapel in the 1580s, the pieces seem to have been selected, organised and even edited and corrected by Byrd himself.

A heavy, oblong folio volume, it retains its original elaborately tooled Morocco binding, stamped with the title, on top of a nineteenth century repair. The illuminated coat of arms of the Neville family is on the title page, with the initials "H.N." in the lower left-hand corner. There are 192 leaves each consisting of four six-line staves with large, diamond-shaped notes. At the end is a table of contents.

== History ==
John Harley has established the dedicatee as Elizabeth Bacon (c.1541 – 3 May 1621), eldest daughter of Queen Elizabeth's Lord Keeper Sir Nicholas Bacon (1510–1579), by his first wife, Jane Ferneley (d.1552), the daughter of William Ferneley of Suffolk. Elizabeth Bacon was the third wife of Sir Henry Neville of Billingbear House, Berkshire, whose arms on the title page have now been identified. Thomas Morley also dedicated a book to her (as Lady Periam). Harley has postulated some reasons for the inception of the book, but nothing firm has been established. Sir Henry and his family were not Catholics, but his son Henry's association with Robert Devereux, 2nd Earl of Essex is evidence that the family may have been in favour of religious tolerance.

The date of the manuscript however leaves no doubt, as it was signed as completed by the scribe John Baldwin in Windsor with the following colophon:

finished & ended the leventh of September in the yeare of our lorde god 1591 & in the 33 yeare of the raigne of our sofferaine ladie Elizabeth by the grace of god queene of Englande etc, by me Jo. Baldwine of windsore. laudes deo.

Baldwin was a fervent admirer of Byrd: at the end of the fourth galliard he noted: "mr. w. birde. homo memorabilis", and in his commonplace book, he wrote a poem praising Byrd, "whose greate skill and knowledge doth excelle all at this tyme / and farre to strange countries abroade his skill dothe shyne"

Elizabeth Neville must have been closely associated with Byrd, whether as pupil or patron is not known, but the book was most probably a gift to her. She lived principally at Hambleden in Buckinghamshire, near to where Byrd and his brothers had a home. At some time it was presented to Queen Elizabeth by Sir Henry Neville, and then passed through various hands until it was given back in 1668 to an unknown Neville descendant. The book was preserved by the Neville family until the end of the eighteenth century, when it passed through several collectors' hands until it returned to the possession of William Nevill, 1st Marquess of Abergavenny. In 2006 it was accepted by HM Government in lieu of Inheritance Tax, and allocated to the British Library. In 2009 the British Library digitised the manuscript and made it available as a virtual book on its website. It has also been published in facsimile.

== Contents ==
3. "the marche before the battell" (3:37)

4. "the battell" (12:39)

5. "the galliarde for the victorie" (1:37)
(MIDI renditions)

(Spelling as in the score's pages or in the index – there are some minor differences.)

1. my ladye nevells grownde
2. Qui paſse: for my ladye nevell
3. the marche before the battell
4. the battell
  1. the souldiers sommons
  2. the marche of footemen
  3. the marche of horsemen
  4. the trumpetts
  5. the Irishe marche
  6. the bagpipe and the drone
  7. the flute & the drõme
  8. the marche to the fighte – tantara tantara – the battels be ioyned
  9. The retreat
5. the galliarde for the victorie
6. the barlye breake
7. the galliard gygg
8. the huntes upp
9. vt re mi fa sol la
10. the first Pavian
11. the galliarde to the same
12. the seconde pavian
13. the galliarde to the same
14. the third pavian
15. the galliarde to the same
16. the fourth pavian
17. the galliarde to the same
18. the fifte pavian
19. the galliarde to the same
20. the sixte pavian [Kinbrugh Goodd]
21. the galliarde to the same
22. the seventh pavian
23. the eighte pavian
24. the nynthe pavian [the Passinge Mesures]
25. the galliarde to the same
26. the voluntarie lesson
27. will you walk the woods soe wylde
28. the maydens songe
29. a lesson of voluntarie
30. the seconde grownde
31. have wt you to walsingame
32. all in a garden greene
33. lthe:lo:willobies welcome home
34. the carmans whistle
35. hughe ashtons:grownde
36. A fancie – for my ladye nevell
37. sellingers rownde
38. munsers almaine
39. the tennthe pavian: mr:w:peter
40. the galliarde to the same
41. A fancie
42. A voluntarie

With the exception of the two pieces dedicated to Lady Nevell, the compositions were evidently neither created specifically for the book, nor for the dedicatee, but are representative of some of Byrd's work of the ten to fifteen previous years. The tenth pavan is dedicated to William Petre, the son of the Catholic John, Lord Petre, while the sixth was for Kinborough Good, daughter of Dr James Good. The manuscript is notable for the lack of any liturgical works, and the pieces may reflect the musical tastes of Elizabeth Nevill herself. Dance music is represented mainly by the ten magnificent but somewhat sombre pavans and their galliards, and there are none of Byrd's more lively corantos and voltas found in the Fitzwilliam Virginal Book, and only one of the almans.

The naive battell was supposedly written after the Armada victory of 1588, but more probably alludes to one of the Irish rebellions of the time. It is the first known programmed suite of descriptive music, and shows Byrd in a rare lighthearted vein.

The variation forms, sometimes harmonic, sometimes contrapuntal, are on folk-song and dance tunes, and on the hexachord (ut, re, mi, fa, sol, la), possibly an invention of Byrd's. The masterful fantasias and voluntaries (the terms could in this period be used interchangeably), at least one of which is an arrangement of a fantasia for consort, are not likely to have been composed before the late 1580s, but in any case a full generation before the Italian keyboard masters published their toccatas.

== Recordings ==
Complete recordings of the music in the booke have been made by harpsichordists Christopher Hogwood, Pieter-Jan Belder, and Elizabeth Farr. Davitt Moroney's recording of the complete keyboard works of William Byrd includes all these pieces. Some pieces, including "Sellingers Rownde" and "Hughe Ashtons Grownde", have been recorded by Glenn Gould on piano.
