= Drexel 4302 =

17th-century music manuscript

- New York Public Library for the Performing Arts
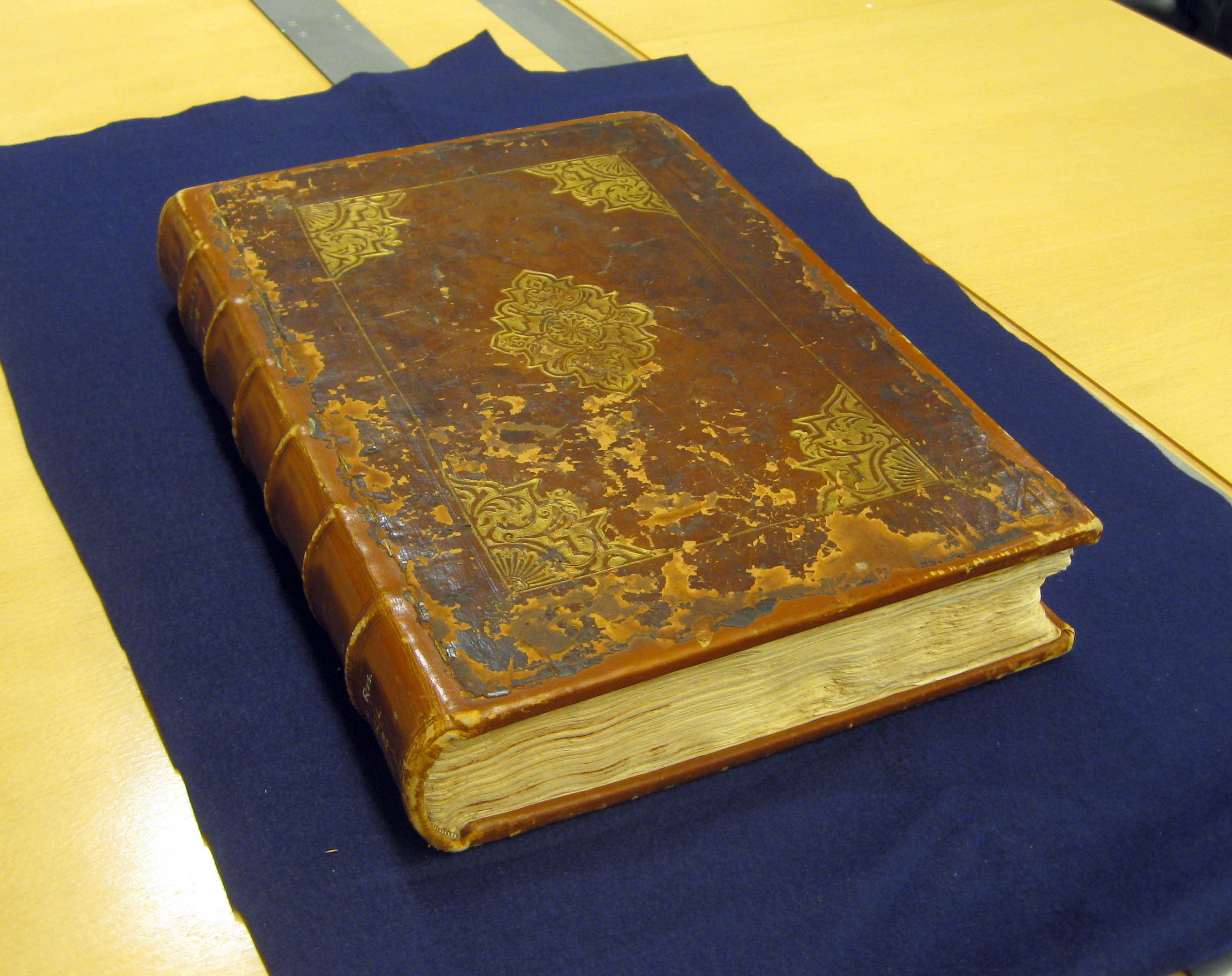
- Date: 17th century
- Place of origin: England
- Language(s): English, Italian, Latin
- Size: 257 leaves

Drexel 4302, also known as the Sambrook Book, based on an inscription from a former owner, Francis Sambrook, is a music manuscript containing vocal and keyboard music from Italian and British composers, documenting the transition from Renaissance to Baroque music. Though literature on the manuscript has assumed the copyist was Francis Tregian the Younger, recent analysis has demolished that hypothesis (not without some musicological contention).

Belonging to the New York Public Library, it forms part of the Music Division's Drexel Collection, located at the New York Public Library for the Performing Arts. Following traditional library practice, its name is derived from its call number.

== False attribution ==
The origins of Drexel 4302 or reasons why it came into existence are unknown. For many years it was thought to have been copied by Francis Tregian the Younger during his incarceration in Fleet Prison from about 1608 until his death in 1618. Based on a physical analysis of the manuscript (and an analysis of writings on Tregian), Ruby Reid Thompson has shown that not only is this attribution extremely unlikely, but that the basis for the belief of Tregian's to the manuscript was also very tenuous.

== Physical description ==
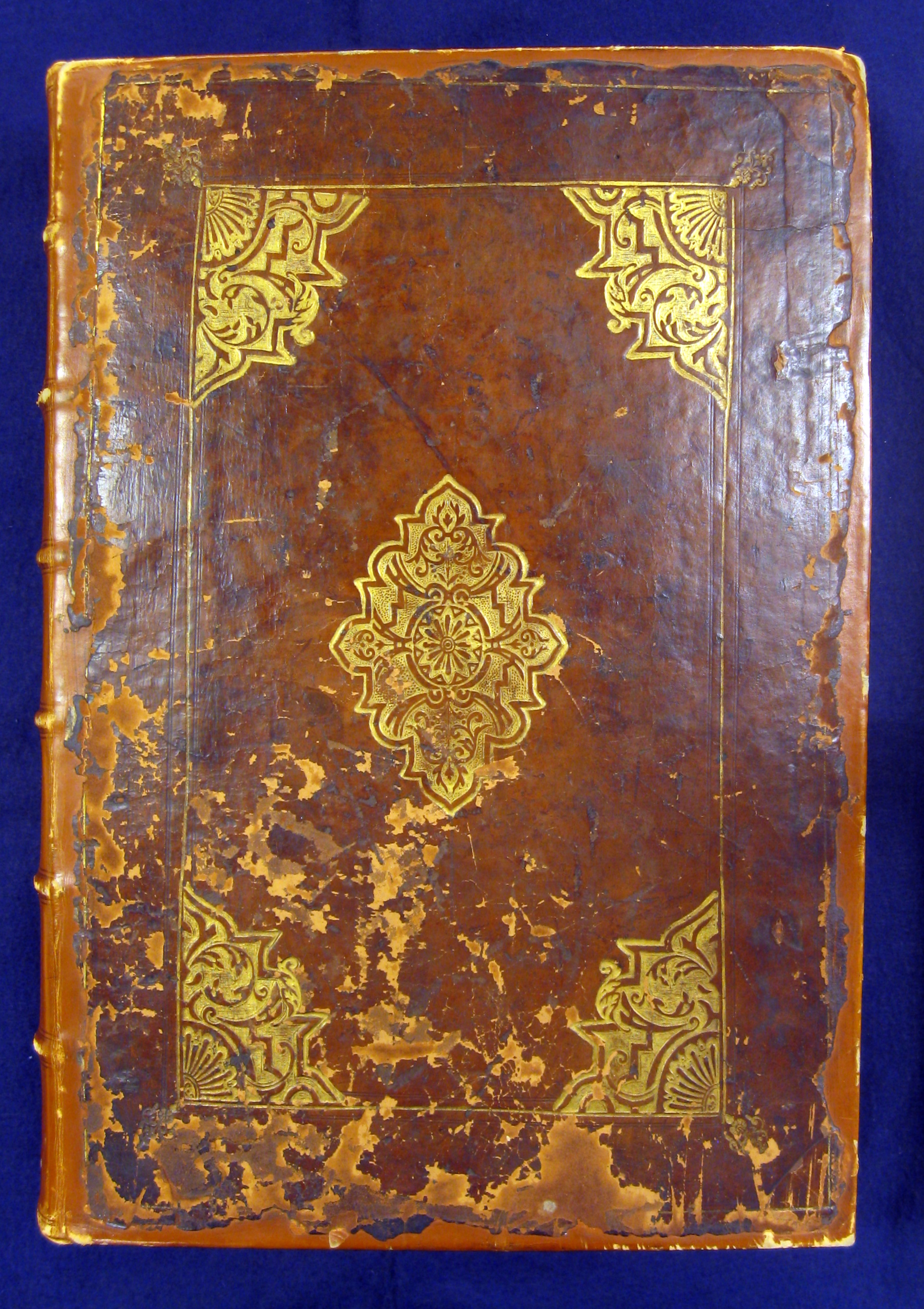
Front cover of Drexel 4302, a manuscript collection

Thompson found that Drexel 4302 consists of original 257 folios. Five of these sheets are of high quality paper made by the Düring family of Basel, Switzerland. The remaining 252 folios were made by the Wendelin Riehel mill in Strasbourg. (Most of the paper used in English manuscripts can be traced to France and Italy, and to a lesser extent in the Rhine region including Basel and Strasbourg.) Beyond the Fitzwilliam Virginal Book, Egerton 3665 (in the British Library), and Mus. 510-514A in the Christ Church Library, Thompson found no other music manuscripts that used either of these papers. Expanding her search, she found use of these papers in England and its use on the continent was scarce. She found that three of Inigo Jones drawings used Düring paper with a similar (but not identical) watermark, all connected to the court and dating 1619–1624. Thompson concluded: "All the manuscripts containing such papers are found in documents relating to the cultural activities or the official business of the royal courts. Thus a corresponding connection may exist between the four music manuscripts [the Fitzwilliam Virginal Book, Egerton 3665, Mus. 510-514A and Drexel 4302] and the musical activities of the English court.

Originally of German Regal size (a standard used at the time), the height of the folios indicate they have been only slightly trimmed. Their height range from 405 to 415 millimetres (15.9 to 16.3 in) and the width ranges from 268 to 280 millimetres (10.6 to 11.0 in).

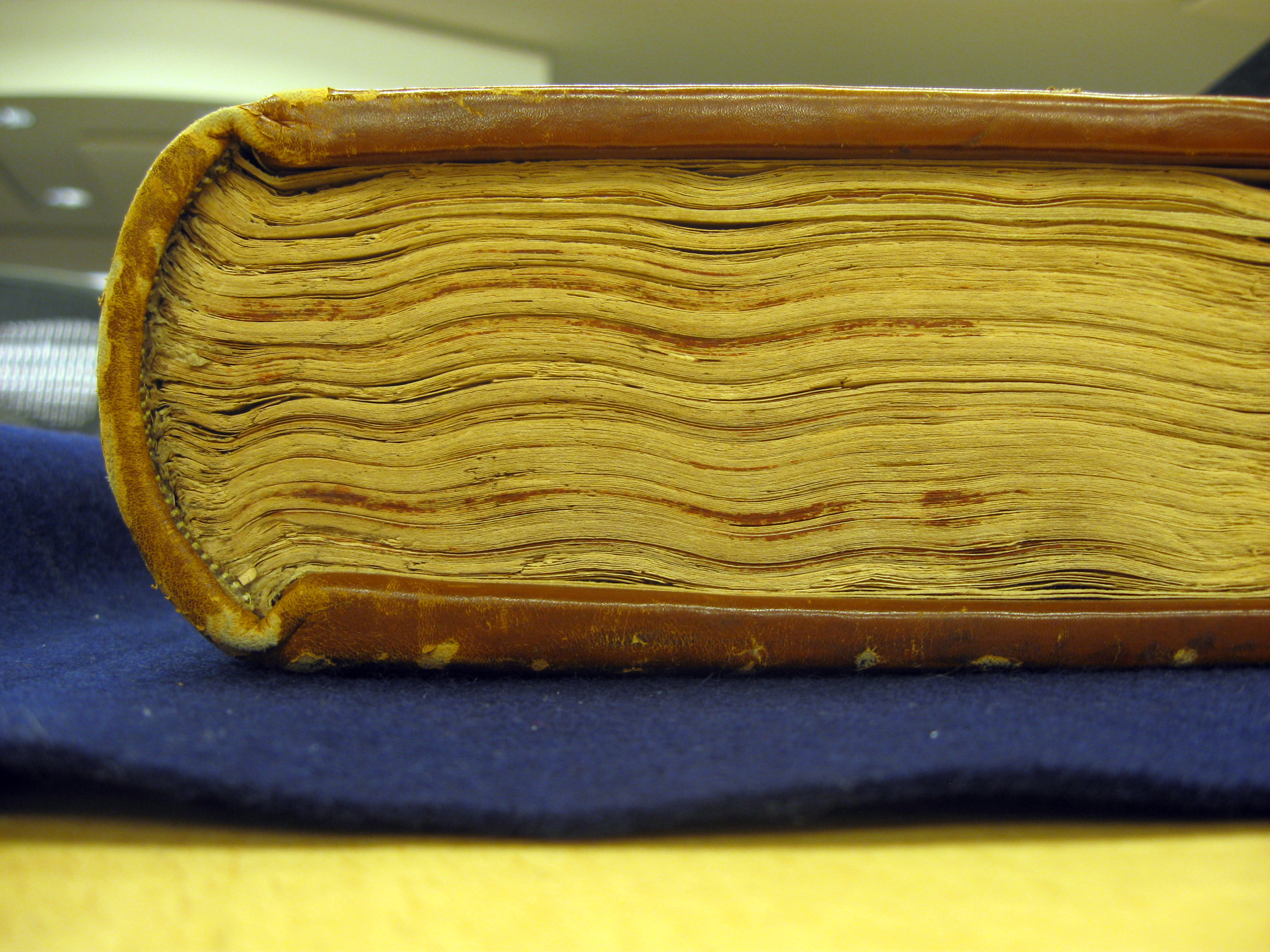
View from the bottom edge of Drexel 4302 showing the multiple gatherings

The manuscript has twenty-one gatherings. Ten of these are perfect (meaning that no leaves were removed or were added to the gathering), implying they were copied by professional copyists. The remaining eleven gatherings are now imperfect with diverse structures (meaning that leaves were removed or added). The outer leaves of all the gatherings show greater wear than the inner leaves, indicating that the gatherings were originally separate and used independently. Only later were they brought together and bound to create an aggregate volume.

Although many music manuscripts of this time are laid out page by page, the scores in Drexel 4302 are generally laid out across two facing pages. This means that a line of music will begin on a verso of a leaf and continue to the recto of the following leaf before continuing on the previous verso.

== Dating ==
Until Thompson's article, most writers assumed the final date of copying of the manuscript close to Tregian's death. Since Thompson discredited the hypothesis of Tregian's involvement, she suggested that an estimation of date need not be influenced by Tregian's death date. Based on Persons' thesis, some works could have been copied from Il Parnasso published in Antwerp in 1613—a date that suggests an approximate time frame.

== Provenance ==
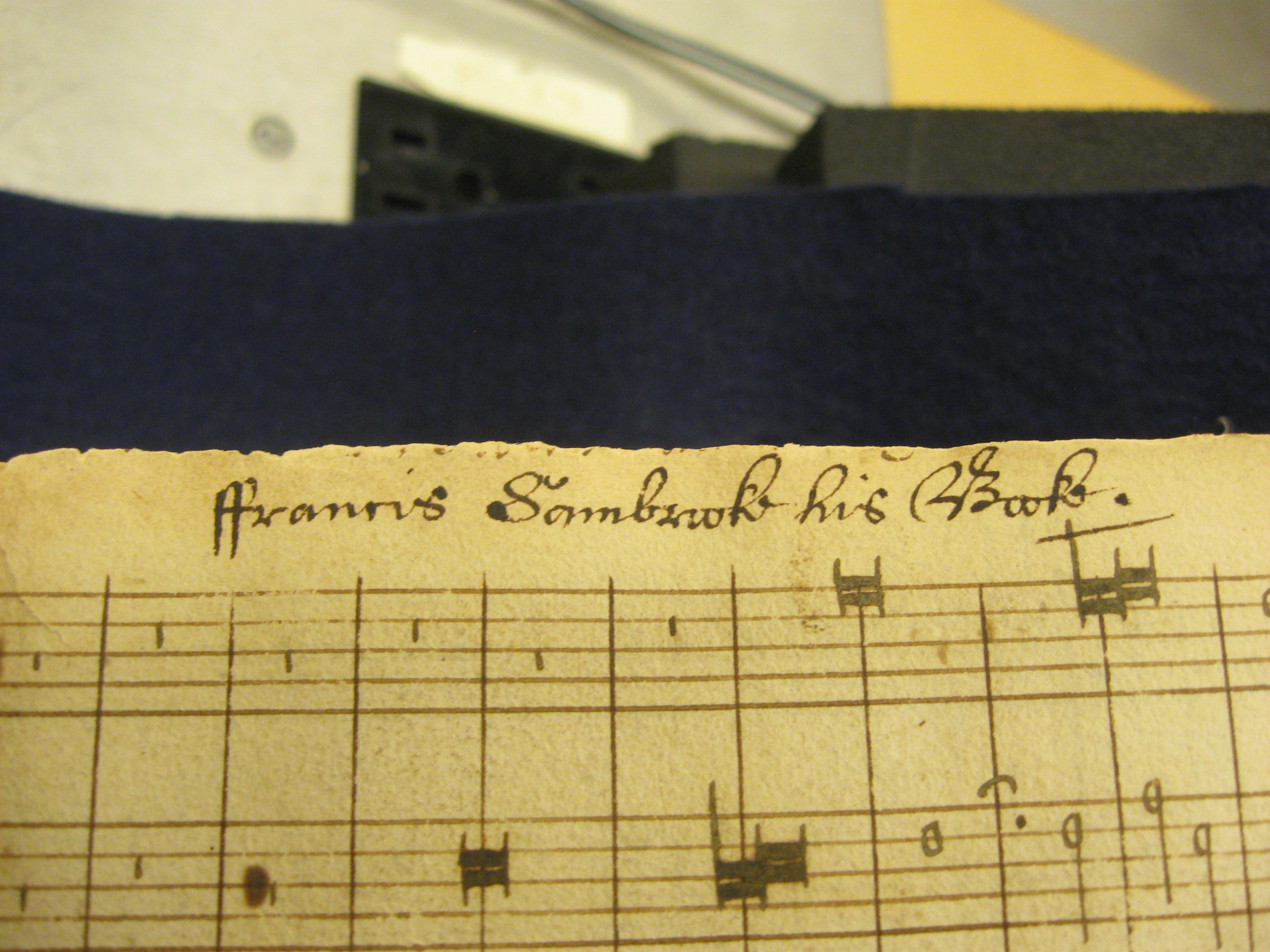
Inscription by Francis Sambrook on the first page of music

The earliest identified owner of Drexel 4302 was Francis Sambrook who inscribed his name on various parts of the manuscript, including the front cover. Exactly which Francis Sambrook this was is an open question. Edward F. Rimbault (a later owner) had written on the first page that Sambrook died in 1660 and was buried at Salisbury. But Bertram Schofield and Thurston Dart wrote that there was apparently another Francis Sambrook who was Clerk of Records to the Bishop of Salisbury Courts in 1662 to whom composer Henry Lawes left the compositions of his brother William Lawes. Exact identification awaits further investigation as there were several people named Francis Sambrook active during the mid-17th century.

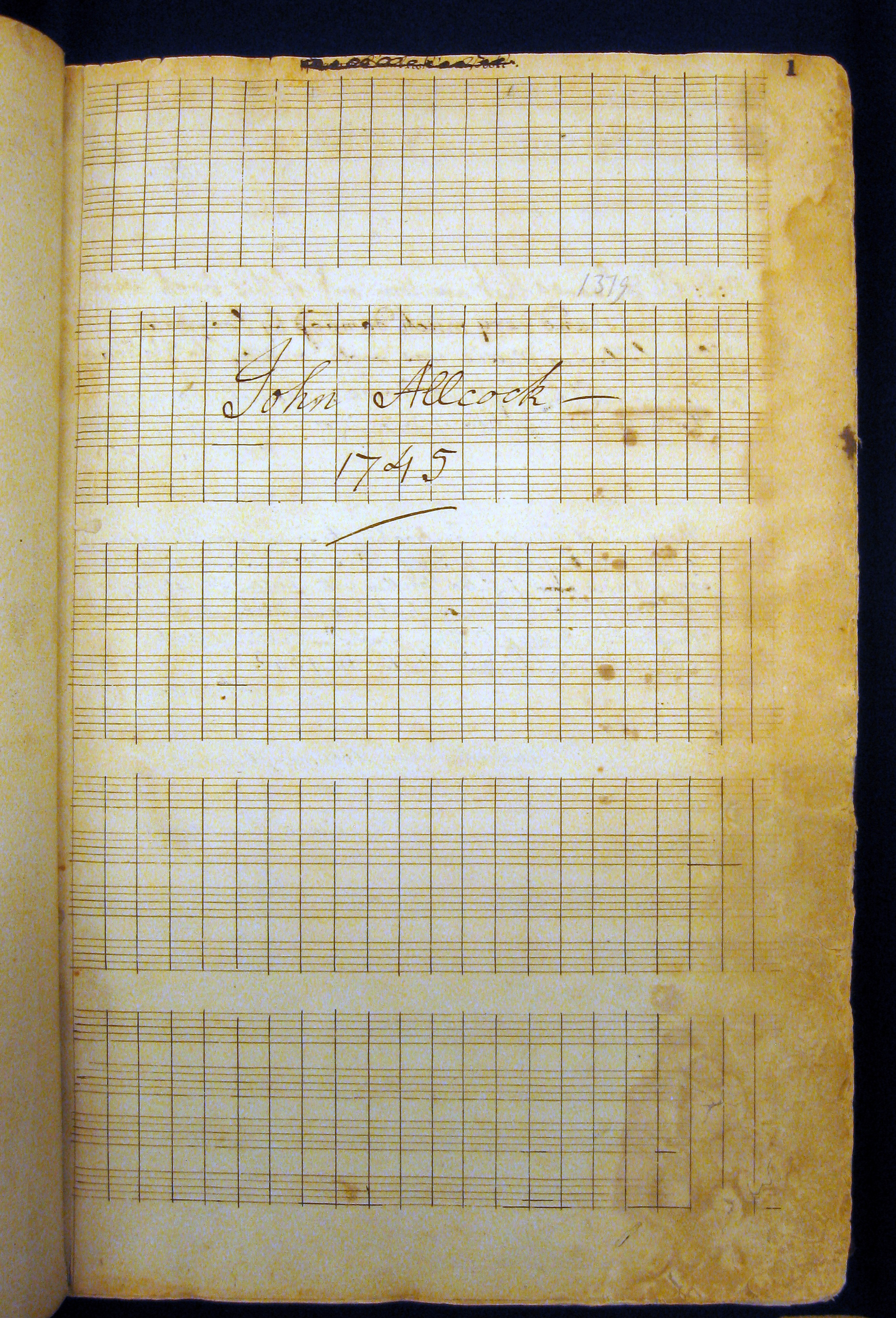
Signature of John Alcock on the first ruled page of Drexel 4302

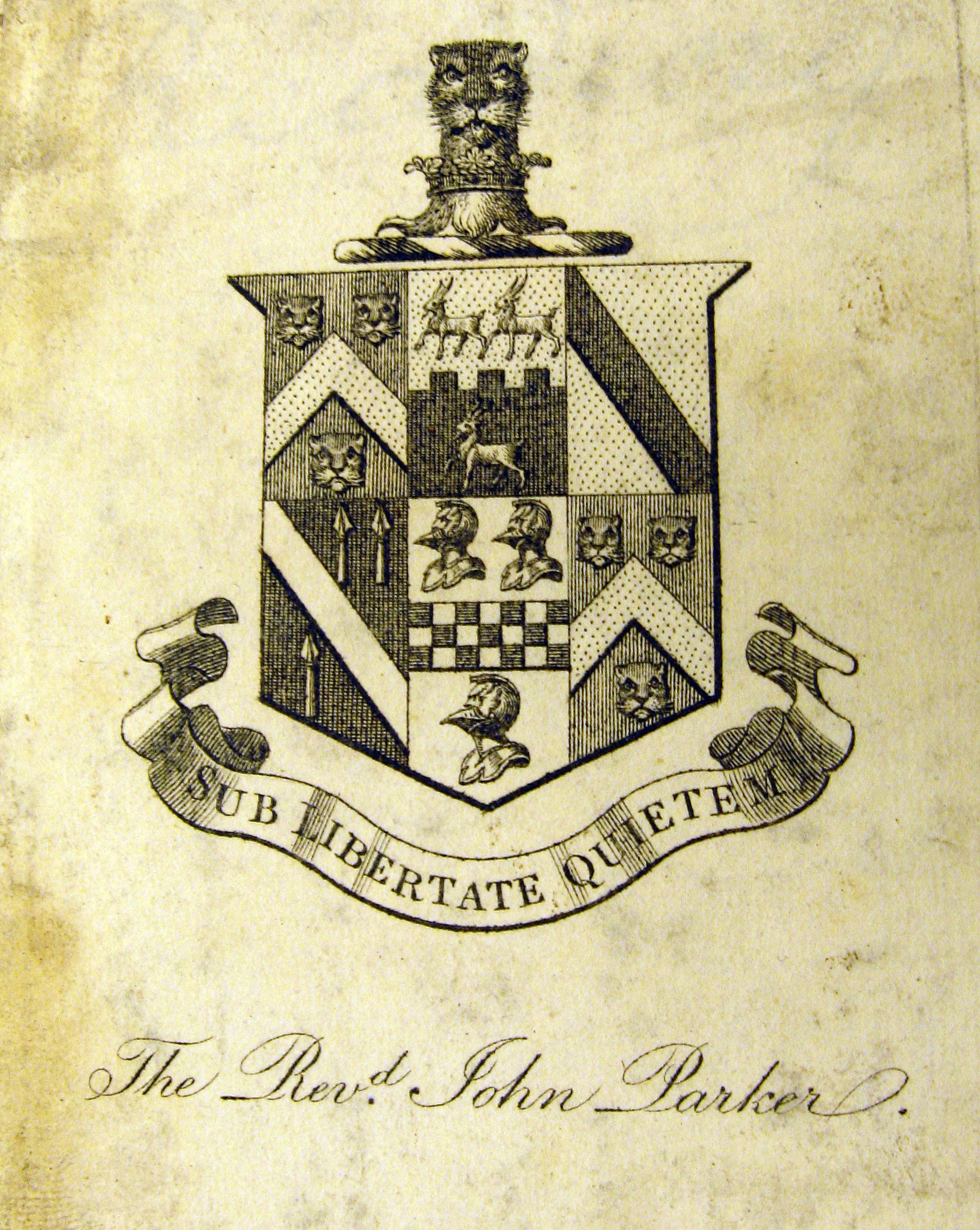
Bookplate of John Parker

Subsequent owners are known from their inscriptions on the manuscript's initial pages. The first is signed "Dr. Allcock" who Jerry C. Persons identifies as the organist and composer John Alcock (1715–1806). It reads: "All the following Music was wrote out of the Vatican (or Pope's Library) at Rome." This is followed by a statement signed by "Rev. John Parker": "I do not find any authority for this assertion by Dr. Alcock.". Persons identifies Parker as the vicar of St. George's, London, who "copied out madrigals for himself."

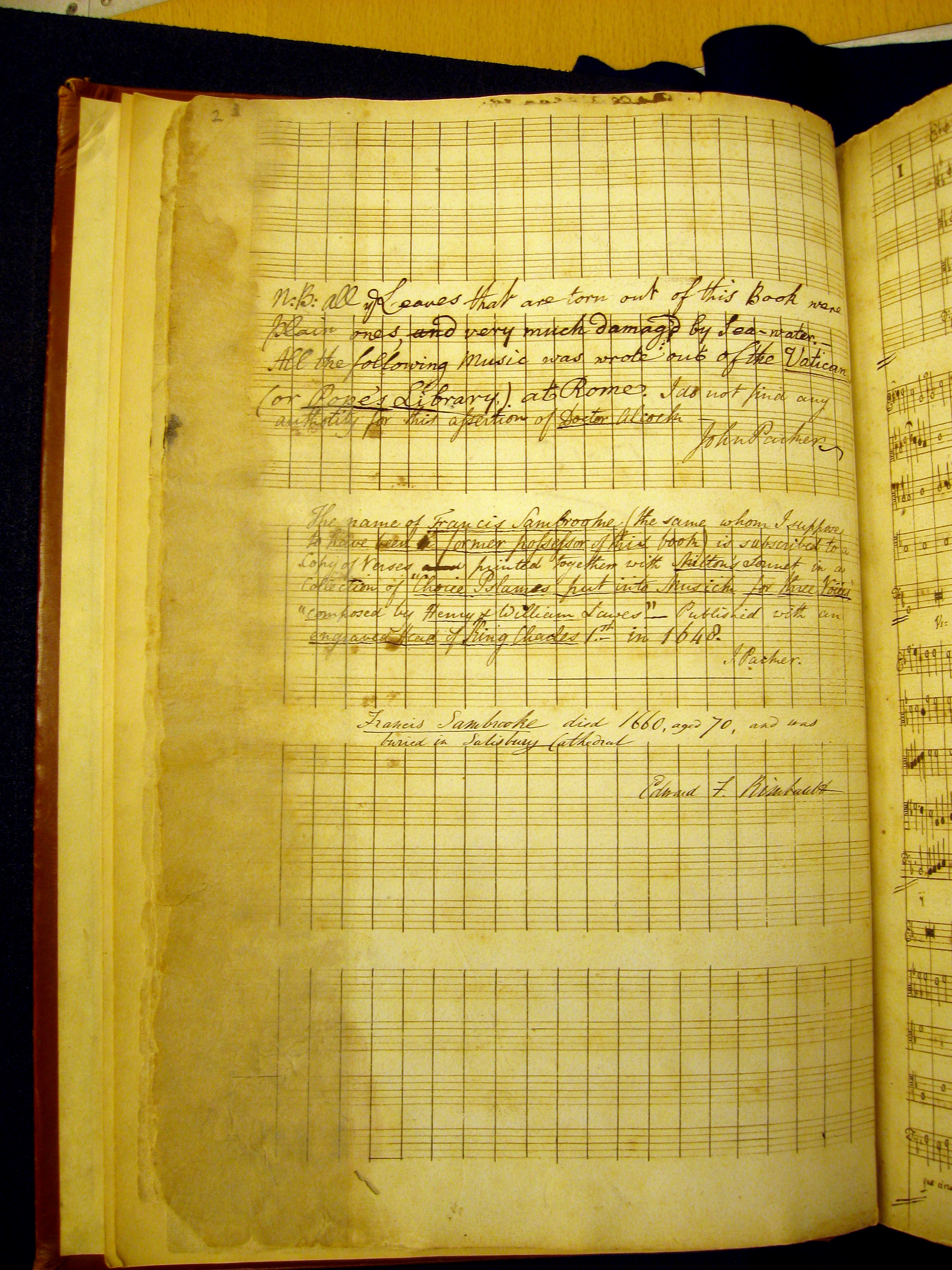
Page opposite the first page of music with inscriptions John Parker and Edward F. Rimbault

It is not known how Edward F. Rimbault came to own the manuscript, although it is not surprising considering he owned many unique English manuscripts. After his death in 1876, it was listed in the catalog of his estate as lot 1379:

MOTETTS, ANTHEMS, MADRIGALS, and Instrumental Pieces...A very large collection in a thick folio volume, in the original binding, rebacked--Autographs of Francis Sambrook (ob. 1660), by whom the collection was probably transcribed, and John Alcock, 1745—Manuscript notes by Dr. Alcock, Rev. John Parker, and Dr. Rimbault, a few leaves damaged by damp

The manuscript was one of about 600 lots purchased by Philadelphia-born financier Joseph W. Drexel, who had already amassed a large music library. Upon Drexel's death, he bequeathed his music library to The Lenox Library. When the Lenox Library merged with the Astor Library to become the New York Public Library, the Drexel Collection became the basis for one of its founding units, the Music Division. Today Drexel 4302 is part of the Drexel Collection in the Music Division, now located at the New York Public Library for the Performing Arts at Lincoln Center.

== Handwriting ==
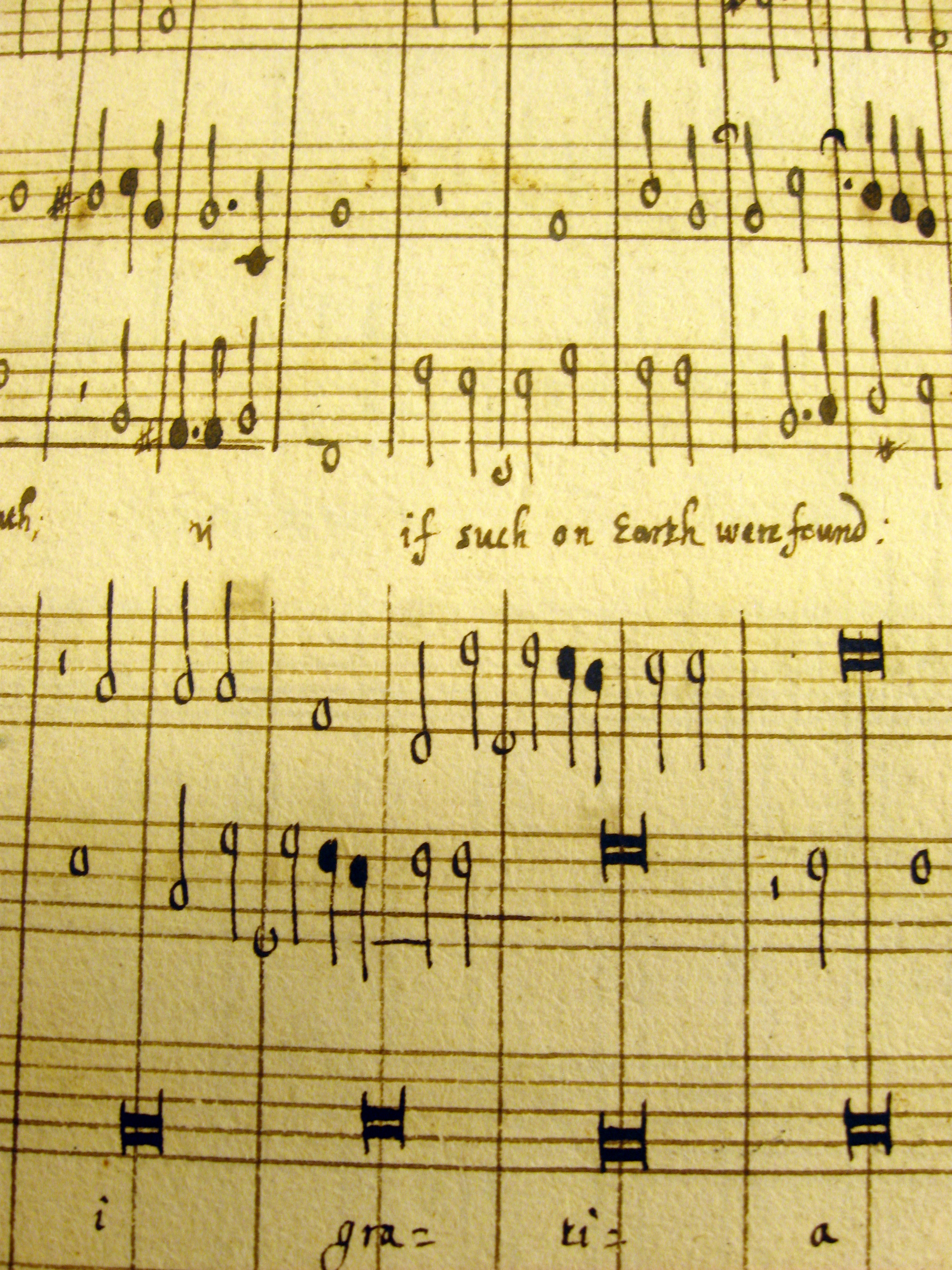
Example of change in handwriting in Drexel 4302 (compare the notation above and below the text "If such on earth were found")

In discussing the handwriting, Thompson differentiates between abrupt and gradual changes of script (both indicating a different scribe). She noted thirty changes of script (seven sudden and twenty-three gradual). In conjunction with her analysis of Egerton 3665, she noted that Drexel 4302 shares nine scripts with that manuscript.

Because they believed that it was in the same hand as the Fitzwilliam Virginal Book and Egerton 3665, Schoefield and Dart thought Drexel 4302 should be considered a continuation of the latter. Thompson has shown that only nine scribal hands are shared between Drexel 4302 and Egerton 3665 (the cumulation of both indicate seventeen different hands) and that these hands are not the same as that of the Fitzwilliam Virginal Book.

== Organization ==
Section contents:

1. Motets by various composers
2. "Motetti a 5 di Alfonso Ferabosco Figliulo"
3. "Motetti di Alfonso Ferabosco il Padre a 6"
4. "Madrigali a 6" by William Daman
5. "Madrigali a 6 di Luca Marenzio"
6. "Madrigali a 6 di Pietro Philippi"
7. "Pavan Passamezzo di Pietro Philippi a 6"
8. "Madrigali a 6 di diversi autori"
9. "Madrigali a 8 di Pietro Philippi"

== Observations ==
Because many of the writings on Drexel 4302 appeared before Ruby Reid Thompson's 1992 and 2001 articles discrediting a single copyist for Drexel 4302 and Egerton 3665, writers often made comparisons between the two manuscripts.

Much of the music from the early 17th century, whether printed or in manuscript, is available only in parts. Edward Lowinsky observed that Drexel 4302 (along with Egerton 3665 and R.M. 24 d.2 in the British Library) provided evidence for the dissemination of the new practice of using scores in early 17th century England.

Bertram Schofield and Thurston Dart noted that both Drexel 4302 and Egerton 3665 consist primarily of English and Italian madrigals. They observed that a marginal note in Egerton 3665 regarding the setting Italia mia ("ex libris Henr. 8, circa annum 1520") is the same note found in a marginal note of an anonymous motet of Drexel 4302 and conclude that the same source was used for the fantasies by Philip van Wilder.

Richard Charteris noted that one of the significant features of Drexel 4302 (and Egerton 3665) are the designations of the three composers named Alfonso Ferrabosco (Alfonso Ferrabosco the elder (1543–1588), Alfonso Ferrabosco the younger (1575–1628) and Alfonso Ferrabosco III (junior) (died 1652)). Both Egerton 3665 and Drexel 4302 indicate "il padre" and "il figliuolo" in titles and "Alfonso Ferrabosco senior" and "Alfonso Ferrabosco junior" for individual pieces.

In his study of the song Amarilli, mia bella and its transmission, Tim Carter noted the importance to Drexel 4302 of publications from the publishing firm Phalesius. The firm was founded in the 16th century by Petrus Phalesius the Elder, whose sons continued it in the 17th century (at the time the manuscript would have been copied). Carter noted that all publications of composer Peter Philips were printed by Phalesius, and that he edited one of Phalesius' anthologies, implying a close relationship between composer and the firm. These publications were significant sources to the copyists of Drexel 4302. Carter posits that the copyist of Drexel 4302 apparently knew Phalesius' 1601 anthology because the manuscript includes arrangements of eight six-part madrigals from the publication.

Carter observed that both Drexel 4302 and Egerton 3665 were important to the transmission of "Amarilli, mia bella." The song was first published in Ghirlanda di madrigalia sei voci, di diversie eccellentissimi autori de nostri tempi, raccolta di giardini di fiori odoriferi musicali issued in 1601 by the Antwerp printer Petrus Phalesius the Younger (RISM 1601^{5}). Carter noted that the copyist of Drexel 4302 copied Amarilli, mia bella on pages 502–18 (nos. 105–15). This copyist created a three-part setting of the work by taking only three of the six parts. Carter observed that this procedure noting some "curious gaps" in the voicing. Rather than copy out the slightly altered repeat, the copyist substituted repeat signs, resulting in an ending that Carter terms "unworkable."

== List of contents ==
This list is based on the online RISM database (see External links below), Persons's thesis, and an examination of the microfilm of the manuscript. With the exception of the initial heading, all subsequent headings are in the manuscript.

Explanation of column headings:

- "Drexel no." These numbers are those penned by the copyists who numbered each work (each part of a work received a separate number)
- Folios: The folios of the manuscript
- Composer: name of the composer
- Title: Title of work, including parts within a work
- Scoring: Following conventional abbreviations (s=soprano; a=alto; t=tenor; b=bass; two or more letters indicate multiple section of that vocal range)
- Notes in manuscript: Persons transcribed when the copyists included an authorial attribution or included other notes
- Possible source: Persons proposed various printed sources for works included in the manuscript. In some cases he found no printed source so he mentioned contemporaneous manuscripts that include the work

| Drexel no. | Folios | Composer | Title | Scoring | Notes in manuscript | Possible source |
|---|---|---|---|---|---|---|
[Motets by various composers]
| 1 | 2r-3r | Orlando di Lasso | Tristis est anima mea | SAATB | Footnote: f.3r: "Orlando di Lasso" | Lasso, Primus liber modulorum, Antwerp, 1571–72 |
| 2 | 2v-3r | Orlando di Lasso | Credidi | SAATB | Footnote: f.2v: "Orlandi di Lasso" | Lasso, Secundus liber modulorum, Antwerp, 1571–72 |
| 3 | 2v | Orlando di Lasso | Vota mea Domino [2nd part] | SAATB | | Lasso, Secundus liber modulorum, Antwerp, 1571–72 |
| 4 | 3v-4v | Orlando di Lasso | Veni in hortum meum | SATTB | Footnote: f.4r: "Orlando di Lasso" | Lasso, Cantionum quatuor, quinque & sex vocum, Antwerp, 1574 |
| 5 | 3v-5r | Orlando di Lasso | Angelus ad pastores ait | SATTB | Footnote: f.5r: "Orlando di Lasso" | Lasso, Primus liber modulorum, Antwerp, 1571–72 |
| 6 | 4v-5r | Orlando di Lasso | In me transierunt irae tuae | SATTB | Footnote: At head of f.5r: "Francis Sambrook's Booke" | Lasso, Primus liber modulorum, Antwerp, 1571–72 |
| 7 | 4v-5v | Peter Philips | Pater noster | SSAAB | Footnote: f.5v: "Pietro Philippi" | Philips, Cantiones Sacrae, Antwerp, 1612 |
| 8 | 5v-6r | Peter Philips | Iste est Joannes | SSATB | Footnote: f.5v: "Pietro Phillippi" | Philips, Cantiones Sacrae, Antwerp, 1612 |
| 9 | 5v-7r | Peter Philips | Ego sum panis vivus | SAATB | Footnote: f.7r: "Pietro Philippi" | Philips, Cantiones Sacrae, Antwerp, 1612 |
| 10 | 6v-7v | Peter Philips | Et panis quam ego [2nd part] | SAATB | Footnote: f.6v: "Pietro Philippi" | Philips, Cantiones Sacrae, Antwerp, 1612 |
| 11 | 7r-8r | Peter Philips | Disciplinam et scientiam | SSATB | Footnote: f.7v: "Pietro Philippi" | Philips, Cantiones Sacrae, Antwerp, 1612 |
| 12 | 7v-8r | Peter Philips | Ave verum corpus | SSAAB | Footnote: f.8r: "Pietro Philippi" | Philips, Cantiones Sacrae, Antwerp, 1612 |
| 13 | 8r-9r | Peter Philips | Maria Magdalena | SSAATB | Footnote: f.8v: "Pietro Philippi" | Philips, Cantiones Sacrae, Antwerp, 1612 |
| 14 | 8v-10r | Peter Philips | Viae Sion lugent eo | SSATB | Footnote: f.10r: "Pietro Philippi" | Philips, Cantiones Sacrae, Antwerp, 1612 |
| 15 | 9v-10v | Peter Philips | Surge Petre | SSTB | Footnote: f.10r: "Pietro Philippi" | Philips, Cantiones Sacrae, Antwerp, 1612 |
| 16 | 10v-11r | Peter Philips | Gaude Maria virgo | SSATB | Footnote: f.11r: "Pietro Philippi" | Philips, Cantiones Sacrae, Antwerp, 1612 |
| 17 | 10v-12r | Peter Philips | Mulieres sedentes | SSATB | Footnote: f.12r: "Pietro Philippi" | Philips, Cantiones Sacrae, Antwerp, 1612 |
| 18 | 12r-13r | Peter Philips | Alma redemptoris mater | SSATB | Footnote: f.13r: "Pietro Philippi" | Philips, Cantiones Sacrae, Antwerp, 1612 |
| 19 | 12-13v | Peter Philips | Beatus Laurentius | SSATB | Footnote: f.12v: "Pietro Philippi" | Philips, Cantiones Sacrae, Antwerp, 1612 |
| 20 | 12v-14r | Peter Philips | Domine Deus meus in te speravi | SSATB | Footnote: f.14r: "Pietro Philippi" | Philips, Cantiones Sacrae, Antwerp, 1612 |
| 21 | 13v-15r | William Byrd | Lullaby my sweet little baby | SSATB | Footnote: f.14r: "William Bird" | Byrd, Psalm, Sonets, and Songs, London, 1588 |
| 22 | 14v | William Byrd | Bee still my blessed [2nd part] | SSATB | | Byrd, Psalm, Sonets, and Songs, London, 1588 |
| 23 | 14v-15r | William Byrd | Why do I use my paper ink and pen | SSATB | Footnote: f.15r: "William Bird" | Byrd, Psalm, Sonets, and Songs, London, 1588 |
| 24 | 14v-16r | Henry VIII, King of England | Nil majus superi | SSATB | Footnote: f.15r: "Ex libris / Henri 8 / circa a[nno] 1520" | Manuscript partbooks, ca. 1528. See note |
| 25 | 15v | Henry VIII, King of England | Ille Musarum naufrages [2nd part] | SSATB | | |
| 26 | 15v-17r | Tomás Luis de Victoria | Ascendens Christus in altum | SSATB | Footnote: f.16v: "Ludovicus a Victoria" | Victoria, Motets for 4, 5, 6 and 8 voices, Venice, 1572. |
| 27 | 16v | Tomás Luis de Victoria | Ascendit Deus In [2nd part] | SSATB | | Victoria, Motets for 4, 5, 6 and 8 voices, Venice, 1572. |
| 28 | 17v-18r | Tomás Luis de Victoria | Dum complerentur | SSATB | Footnote: f.18r: "Ludovicus a Victoria" | Victoria, Motets for 4, 5, 6 and 8 voices, Venice, 1572. |
| 29 | 18r-19r | Tomás Luis de Victoria | Gaude Maria virgo | SSATB | Footnote: f.19r: "Ludovicus a Victoria" | Victoria, Motets for 4, 5, 6 and 8 voices, Venice, 1572. |
| 30 | 18v-19v | Tomás Luis de Victoria | Alma redemptoris mater | SAATB | Footnote: f.19v: "Ludovicus a Victoria" | Victoria, Motets for 4, 5, 6 and 8 voices, Venice, 1572. |
| 31 | 19v-22r | Tomás Luis de Victoria | Cum beatus Ignatius | SSATB | Footnote: f.20r: "Ludovicus a Victoria" | Victoria, Motets for 4, 5, 6 and 8 voices, Venice, 1572. |
| 32 | 20r | Tomás Luis de Victoria | Ignis Crux Bestia [2nd part] | SSATB | | Victoria, Motets for 4, 5, 6 and 8 voices, Venice, 1572. |
| 33 | 20v-21r | Thomas Lupo | Out of the deep | SAATB | Footnote: f.21r: "Thomas Lupo" | Egerton 995, Additional 29427, Additional 29327-77, Christ Church Oxford MS 56–60, Bodleian Library, Oxford, MSS C45-47, 49, 50 |
| 34 | 20v-22r | Thomas Lupo | Hierusalem plantabis Vinam | SSATB | Footnote: f.22r: "thomas Lupo" | Additional 29427, Additional 29327-77 |
| 35 | 21v-22r | Thomas Lupo | Salva nos Domine | SSATB | Footnote: f.22r: "thomas Lupo" | Additional 29427, Additional 29327-77 |
| 36 | 22r-23r | Thomas Lupo | O vos omnes | SSATB | Footnote: f.23r: "Thomas Lupo" | Additional 29427, Additional 29327-77 |
| 37 | 22v-23r | Thomas Lupo | Miserere mei Domine | SSATB | Footnote: f.23r: "Thomas Lupo" | Additional 29327-77 |
| 38 | 22v-23v | Thomas Lupo | Hear my prayer O Lord | SSATB | Footnote: f.23v: "Thomas Lupo" | Egerton 995, Additional 29427, Christ Church Oxford MSS 56–60 |
| 39 | 23v-24r | Thomas Lupo | Heu mihi Domine | SSATB | Footnote: f.24r: "Thomas Lupo" | Additional 29427, Additional 29327-77 |
| 40 | 23v-25r | Thomas Lupo | Miserere | SSATB | Footnote: f.25r: "Thomas Lupo" | Additional 29327-77 |
| 41 | 24v-25v | Thomas Weelkes | When David heard that Absalom was slain | SSATB | Footnote: f.25r: "Thomas Wilks" | Additional 29327-77, Christ Church Oxford MSS 56–60 |
| 42 | 25r | Thomas Weelkes | O my sonne, Absalon [2nd part] | | | Additional 29327-77 |
| 43 | 25v | William Daman | Miserere nostri Domine | SAATB | Footnote: f.25v: "William Daman" | Additional 29327-77 and 5054 |
| 44 | 25v-26v | Robert White | Precamur sancte Domine | SAATB | Footnote: f.26v: "White" | Christ Church, Oxford MSS979-81, 983; Christ Church Oxford MS 984-88; Bodleian Library Oxford MS E. 423 |
Motetti a 5 di Alfonso Ferrabosco il figliulo
| 45 | 27r-28r | Alfonso Ferrabosco | Ego sum resurrectio | SSATB | Footnote: f.28r: "Alfonso Ferabosco. Jun" | Add. 29366-68 |
| 46 | 27v-28r | Alfonso Ferrabosco | O nomen Jesu | SSATB | Footnote: f.28r: "Alf. Fer. Jun" | Add. 29327-77, Add. 29366-68 |
| 47 | 27v-29r | Alfonso Ferrabosco | Ego dixi Domine miserere mei | SSATB | Footnote: f.28v: "Alf. Fer. Jun" | Add. 29327-77, Add. 29366-68 |
| 48 | | Alfonso Ferrabosco | Convertere Domine [2 parte] | SSATB | | Add. 29366-68 (Q, C and B only) |
| 49 | 29r-30v | Alfonso Ferrabosco | Ubi duo vel tres | SSATB | Footnote: f.30r: "Alf. Ferab. Jun" | Add. 29366-68 (Q, C and B only) |
| 50 | | Alfonso Ferrabosco | Liberame Domine 2d pars | SSATB | | Add. 29366-68 (Q, C and B only) |
| 51 | 30v-31r | Alfonso Ferrabosco | Domine Deus meus in te speravi | SSATB | Footnote: f.31v: "Alf. Fer. Jun" | Add. 29366-68 (Q, C and B only) |
| 52 | | Alfonso Ferrabosco | Noli me precerem 2d pars | SSATB | | Add. 29366-68 (Q, C and B only) |
| 53 | 31v | Alfonso Ferrabosco | Laboravi in gemitu meo | SSATB | Footnote: f.33r: "Alfonso Ferrabosco Jun" | Christ Church, Oxford, MSS 463–67 |
| 54 | 32v-34r | Alfonso Ferrabosco | Lamentations | ATTBB, Coro A, Coro T (2), Coro B (2) | Footnote: f.34r: "Alfonso Ferrabosco Junior" | |
| 55 | 34r-35v | Alfonso Ferrabosco | Tribulationem et dolorem inveni | SSATB | Footnote: f.34v: "Alfonso Ferabosco / Jun" | |
| 56 | | Alfonso Ferrabosco | O Domine [2a parte] | SSATB | | |
| 57 | 35v-36r | Alfonso Ferrabosco | Fortitudo mea | SSATB | Footnote: f.35v: "Alfonso Ferrabosco / Jun" | |
| 58 | 35v-37r | Alfonso Ferrabosco | Sustinuit anima mea | SAATB | Footnote: f.37r: "Alfonso Ferrabosco / Jun" | |
| 59 | 37v-38r | Jacob Clemens non Papa | Qui consolabatur me | SATTB | Footnote: At tail of f.37v: "Clemens non Papa" | Clemens, Liber primus cantionum sacrum, Louvain, 1554 |
| 60 | 39r-40r | Luca Marenzio | E so come in un | SATTB | Footnote: f.40r: "Marenzo" | Marenzio, Il 9° libro di Madrigali a 5 voci, Venice, 1599 |
| 61 | 40r | Luca Marenzio | Chiaro Segno Amor [fragment] | | | |
| 62 | 39v-40v | Luca Marenzio | L'aura che 'l verde lauro e l'aureo crine | SATTB | Footnote: f.40r: "Marenzo" | Marenzio, Il 9° libro di Madrigali a 5 voci, Venice, 1599 |
| 63 | | Luca Marenzio | Si ch'io no vegeia [2° parte] | SATTB | | Marenzio, Il 9° libro di Madrigali a 5 voci, Venice, 1599 |
| 64 | 40v-42r | Luca Marenzio | Il vago e bello Armillo | SATTB | Footnote: f.40v: "Marenzo" | Marenzio, Il 9° libro di Madrigali a 5 voci, Venice, 1599 |
| 65 | | Luca Marenzio | E dicea [2° parte] | SATTB | | Marenzio, Il 9° libro di Madrigali a 5 voci, Venice, 1599 |
| 66 | 41v-42r | Luca Marenzio | Solo e pensoso i più deserti campi | SATTB | Footnote: f.42v: "Marenzo" | Marenzio, Il 9° libro di Madrigali a 5 voci, Venice, 1599 |
| 67 | 42v | Luca Marenzio | Si ch'io mi cred [2° parte] | SATTB | Footnote: f.42v: "Marenzo" | Marenzio, Il 9° libro di Madrigali a 5 voci, Venice, 1599 |
| 68 | 42v | Luca Marenzio | Vivo in guerra mendico e son dolente | SATTB | Footnote | Marenzio, Il 9° libro di Madrigali a 5 voci, Venice, 1599 |
Motetti di Alfonso Ferrabosco il Padre a 6
| 69 | 43r-45r | Alfonso Ferrabosco | Exaudi Deus orationem meam | AATTBB | Footnote: f.43v: "Alfonso Ferabosco / Sen" | Add. 31417 (A and T only) |
| 70 | | Alfonso Ferrabosco | Quoniam [2e pars] | AATTBB | | Add. 31417 (A and T only) |
| 71 | 44v-46r | Alfonso Ferrabosco | In monte Oliveti | SAATBB | Footnote: f.46r: "Alfonso Ferabsoco / Sen" | Ferrabosco I, Sacrae cantiones, Nuremberg, 1585 |
| 72 | 45v-47r | Alfonso Ferrabosco | Da pacem Domine in diebus nostris | SSAATB | Footnote: f.47r: "Alfonso Ferabosco / Sen" | Add. 31417 |
| 73 | 46v-48r | Alfonso Ferrabosco | Tibi soli peccavi [2° parte] | SATTBB | Footnote: f.47r: "Alfonso Ferabosco / Sen" | |
| 74 | | Alfonso Ferrabosco | Ecce enim [2e pars] | SATTBB | | |
| 75 | 47v-51r | Alfonso Ferrabosco | Incipit lamentatio Jeremiae prophetae | SAATBB | Footnote: f.51r: "Alfonso Ferabosco / Sen" | |
| 76 | 50v-51v | Alfonso Ferrabosco | Inclina Domine aurem | SAATTB | Footnote: f.51v: "Alfonso Ferabosco / Sen" | Add. 29388-92, Add. 30361-66, Add. 30810-15 |
| 77 | 51v-54r | Alfonso Ferrabosco | Afflictus sum et humiliatus sum nimis | SAATTB | Footnote: f.53r: "Alfonso Ferabosco / Sen" | |
| 78 | | Alfonso Ferrabosco | Ne derelinquas me Domine [2e pars] | SAATTB | | |
| 79 | 53v-55r | Alfonso Ferrabosco | Heu mihi Domine | SATTBB | Footnote: f.55r: "Alfonso Ferabosco / Sen" | Add. 31417 |
| 80 | 54v-56r | Alfonso Ferrabosco | Salva nos Domine | SAATTB | Footnote: f.56r: "Alfonso Ferabosco / Senior" | Add. 31417 (A and T only) |
| 81 | 55v-57r | Alfonso Ferrabosco | Timor et tremor | SAATBB | Footnote: f.56v: "Alfonso Ferabosco / Sen" | Ferrabosco I, Sacrae cantiones, Nuremberg, 1585 |
| 82 | | Alfonso Ferrabosco | Exaudi Deus [2e pars] | SAATBB | | Ferrabosco I, Sacrae cantiones, Nuremberg, 1585 |
| 83 | 57r-58v | Alfonso Ferrabosco | Domine non secundum | SSATTB | Footnote: f.58v: "Alfonso Ferabosco / Senior" | Add. 31922 (for lute) |
Motetti et Madrigali a 6 di Alfonso Ferrabosco Seniore
| 84 | 59r-60r | Alfonso Ferrabosco | Decantabat populus Israel | SSAATB | Footnote: f.60r: "Alfonso Ferabosco / Sen" | |
| 85 | 59v-61r | Alfonso Ferrabosco | Cantabo Domino in vita mea | SAATTB | Footnote: f.61r: "Alfonso Feraboso [!] / Sen" | ADD. 29388-92, Christ Church Oxford MSS 78–82 and 463–67 |
Madrigali a 6
| 86 | 60v-62r | Alfonso Ferrabosco | Dolce guerriera mia | SSAATB | Footnote: f.60v: "Alfonso Ferabosco / Sen" | Tenbury 1018, Fitzwilliam Museum MSS 24. E. 13–17, Filmer Partbooks (Yale) |
| 87 | | Alfonso Ferrabosco | Ma se con l'opre [2° parte] | SSAATB | | Tenbury 1018, Fitzwilliam Museum MSS 24. E. 13–17, Filmer Partbooks (Yale) |
| 88 | 61v-63r | Alfonso Ferrabosco | Grave pene in amor | SSAAB | Footnote: f.63r: "Alfonso Ferabosco / Sen" | Tenbury 1018, Fitzwilliam Museum MSS 24. E. 13–17, |
| 89 | 62v-64r | Alfonso Ferrabosco | Così m'è l'aspettar | SAATTB | Footnote: f.64r: "Alfonso Ferabosco / Sen" | Tenbury 1018, Fitzwilliam Museum MSS 24. E. 13–17, Filmer Partbooks (Yale), Add. 37402 [single part] |
| 90 | 63v-65r | Alfonso Ferrabosco | Interdette speranze e van desio | SAATTB | Footnote: f.65r: "Alfonso Ferabosco / Senior" | Tenbury 1018, Fitzwilliam Museum MSS 24. E. 13–17, Filmer Partbooks (Yale) |
| 91 | 96v-98r | Alfonso Ferrabosco | Se lungi dal mio sol | SAATTB | Footnote: f.66r: "Alfonso Ferabosco / Sen" | Musica Transalpina, London, 1588 |
| 92 | 65v-67r | Alfonso Ferrabosco | Ecco che un'altra volta | SSATTB | Footnote: f.66v: "Alfonso Ferabosco / Sen" | |
| 93 | | Alfonso Ferrabosco | E se di vero [2° parte] | SSATTB | | |
| 94 | 66v-78r | Alfonso Ferrabosco | Virgine bella che di sol vestita | SAATTB | Footnote: f.68v: "Alfonso Ferabosco / Sen" | |
| 95 | | Alfonso Ferrabosco | Virgine saggia e del bel [2° parte] | SAATTB | | |
| 96 | | Alfonso Ferrabosco | Vergine pura e d'ogni [3° parte] | SAATTB | | |
| 97 | | Alfonso Ferrabosco | Vergine Santa d'ogni 4° parte | SAATTB | | |
| 98 | | Alfonso Ferrabosco | Vergine Sol'al mondo senza [5° parte] | SAATTB | | |
| 99 | | Alfonso Ferrabosco | Vergine chiara e stabile [6° parte] | SAATTB | | |
| 100 | | Alfonso Ferrabosco | Vergine quante lagrime [7° parte] | SAATTB | | |
| 101 | | Alfonso Ferrabosco | Vergine tale e terra [8° parte] | SAATTB | | |
| 102 | | Alfonso Ferrabosco | Vergine in cui ho tutta [9° parte] | SAATTB | | |
| 103 | | Alfonso Ferrabosco | Vergine humana enemica [10° parte] | SAATTB | | |
| 104 | | Alfonso Ferrabosco | Il di s'appressa et non [11° parte] | SAATTB | | |
| 105 | 78r-80r | Alfonso Ferrabosco | Mentre ch'il cor dagli amorosi vermi | SSATTB | Footnote: f.79r: "Alfonso Ferabosco / Sen" | Filmer Partbooks (Yale) |
| 106 | | Alfonso Ferrabosco | Quel foco [2° parte] | SSATTB | | Filmer Partbooks (Yale) |
| 107 | 80r-81r | Alfonso Ferrabosco | Se pur è ver che l'alma | SAATTB | Footnote: f.81r: "Alfonso Ferabosco / Sen" | |
| 108 | 81r-82r | Alfonso Ferrabosco | Quel sempre acerbo | SAATTB | Footnote: f.82r: "Alfonso Ferabosco / Sen" | |
| 109 | 81v-84r | Alfonso Ferrabosco | Io vo piangendo i miei passati tempi | SAATTB | Footnote: f.83v: "Alfonso Ferabosco / Sen" | |
| 110 | | Alfonso Ferrabosco | Si che s'io vissi in [2e parte] | SAATTB | | |
| 111 | 83v-85r | Alfonso Ferrabosco | Valle che dei lamenti | SAATB | Footnote: f.84v: "Alfonso Ferabosco / Sen" | |
| 112 | | Alfonso Ferrabosco | Ben riconosco in lei [2e parte] | SAATB | | |
| 113 | 85v-87r | Alfonso Ferrabosco | Lasso me ch'ad un tempo | SAATB | Footnote: f.86r: "Alfonso Ferabosco / Sen" | Filmer Partbooks (Yale) |
| 114 | | Alfonso Ferrabosco | Cerco fermar il Sol ardo [2e parte] | SAATB | | Filmer Partbooks (Yale) |
| 115 | 86-87v | Alfonso Ferrabosco | Hor vedi Amor che giovinetta donna | SAATTB | Footnote: f.87v: "Alfonso Ferrabosco / Sen" | |
| 116 | | Alfonso Ferrabosco | Tu sei prigion ma se pieta [2e parte] | SAATTB | | |
| 117 | 87v-89r | Alfonso Ferrabosco | Non è lasso martire | SSAATB | Footnote: f.88v: "Alfonso Ferrabosco / Sen" | |
| 118 | 88v-90r | Alfonso Ferrabosco | Voi volete ch'io moia | SSAATB | Footnote: f.90r: "Alfonso Ferrabosco / Sen" | Nevi d'Orfeo, Leiden, 1605 |
| 119 | 89r-91r | Alfonso Ferrabosco | Già disfatt'ha le nevi intorno | SAATTB | Footnote: f.90v: "Alfonso Ferrabosco / Sen" | |
| 120 | 91r | Alfonso Ferrabosco | Esser non puo ch'al suon delle | | | |
| 121 | 91r-93r | Alfonso Ferrabosco | Benedetto sia'l giorno | SAATTB | Footnote: f.92r: "Alfonso Ferabosco Sen" | Filmer Partbooks (Yale) |
| 122 | 92v | Alfonso Ferrabosco | Benedette le Voce tante [2e parte] | SAATTB | | Filmer Partbooks (Yale) |
| 123 | 93v-94r | Alfonso Ferrabosco | Ogni loco m'attrista | SSATTB | Footnote: f.94r: "Alfonso Ferrabosco / Sen" | |
| 124 | 94r-95r | Alfonso Ferrabosco | O remember not our old sins | SSATTB | Footnote: f.94v: "Alfonso Ferrabosco / Sen" | Christ Church, Oxford MSS 56–60 [lacking B] |
| 125 | 94v-96r | Alfonso Ferrabosco | Questi ch'inditio fan del mio tormento | SSATTB | Footnote: f.96r: "Alfonso Ferrabosco / Sen" | Musica Transalpina, London, 1588 |
| 126 | 95v-97r | Alfonso Ferrabosco | Con lagrime ch'ogn'hor da gli occhi | SAATBB | Footnote: f.96v: "Alfonso Ferrabosco / Sen" | Filmer Partbooks (Yale) |
| 127 | 97v | Alfonso Ferrabosco | Sola voi n’ol sentite [2e parte] | SAATBB | | Musica Transalpina, London, 1588 |
| 128 | 97v-99r | Alfonso Ferrabosco | Fui vicino a cader' | SAATTB | Footnote: f.98v: "Alfonso Ferrabosco / Sen" | Musica Transalpina, London, 1588 |
| 129 | 99v | Alfonso Ferrabosco | Hor com’augel [2e parte] | SAATBB | | Musica Transalpina, London, 1588 |
| 130 | 98v-100v | Alfonso Ferrabosco | Fantasy | b-viola da gamba (6) | Footnote: f.100v: "Alfonso Ferrabosco / Senior" | |
| 131 | 100v-102r | William Daman | Fantasy | Vla da gamba (6) | Footnote: f.102r: "Guillermo Daman" | |
Madrigali a 6 di Luca Marenzio
| 132 | 103r-104r | Luca Marenzio | L'aura serena che fra verdi fronde | SSATTB | Footnote: f.103r: "Marenzo" | Marenzio, Il 1° libro di Madrigali a 6 voci, Venice, 1581 |
| 133 | 104v | Luca Marenzio | Le quali Ella spargea [2e parte] | SSATTB | | Marenzio, Il 1° libro di Madrigali a 6 voci, Venice, 1581 |
| 134 | 104r-105r | Luca Marenzio | Cantai già lieto il mio libero stato | SSATTB | Footnote: f.105r: "Marenzo" | Marenzio, Il 2° libro di Madrigali a 6 voci, Venice, 1584 |
| 135 | 105v | Luca Marenzio | Che la mia donna altiera [2e parte] | SSATTB | | Marenzio, Il 2° libro di Madrigali a 6 voci, Venice, 1584 |
| 136 | 105r-108v | Luca Marenzio | Baci soavi e cari | SSATTB | Footnote: f.106r: "Marenzo" | Marenzio, Il 5° libro di Madrigali a 6 voci, Venice, 1591 |
| 137 | 106v | Luca Marenzio | Baci amorosi e belli [2e parte] | SSATTB | | Marenzio, Il 5° libro di Madrigali a 6 voci, Venice, 1591 |
| 138 | 107v | Luca Marenzio | Baci affamati e regardi [3e parte] | SSATTB | | Marenzio, Il 5° libro di Madrigali a 6 voci, Venice, 1591 |
| 139 | 107v | Luca Marenzio | Baci cortesi e grave [4e parte] | SSATTB | | Marenzio, Il 5° libro di Madrigali a 6 voci, Venice, 1591 |
| 140 | 109r | Luca Marenzio | Baci, oime no mirate [5e parte] | SSATTB | | Marenzio, Il 5° libro di Madrigali a 6 voci, Venice, 1591 |
| 141 | 108r-109r | Luca Marenzio | Vivrò dunque lontano | SSATTB | Footnote: f.109r: "Marenzo" | Marenzio, Il 5° libro di Madrigali a 6 voci, Venice, 1591 |
| 142 | 108v-109v | Luca Marenzio | Danzava con maniere sopr'humane | SSATTB | Footnote: f.109v: "Marenzo" | Marenzio, Il 3° libro di Madrigali a 6 voci, Venice, 1585 |
| 143 | 109v-110r | Luca Marenzio | Per duo coralli ardenti | SSATTB | Footnote | Marenzio, Il 1° libro di Madrigali a 6 voci, Venice, 1581 |
| 144 | 109v-111r | Luca Marenzio | Arsi gran tempo e del mio foco indegno | SAATTB | Footnote: f.111r: "Marenzi" | Marenzio, Il 4° libro di Madrigali a 6 voci, Venice, 1587 |
| 145 | 112r | Luca Marenzio | Lasso e conosco hor ben [2e parte] | SAATTB | | Marenzio, Il 4° libro di Madrigali a 6 voci, Venice, 1587 |
| 146 | 110v-112r | Luca Marenzio | O dolorosa sorte | SAATTB | Footnote: f.112r: "Marenzo" | Marenzio, Il 1° libro di Madrigali a 6 voci, Venice, 1581 |
| 147 | 111v-113r | Luca Marenzio | Tutte sue squadre di miserie e stenti | SAATTB | Footnote: f.112v: "Marenzo" | Marenzio, Il 2° libro di Madrigali a 6 voci, Venice, 1584 |
| 148 | 112v-113v | Luca Marenzio | Ahimè tal fu d'Amore | SAATTB | Footnote: f.113v: "Marenzo" | Marenzio, Il 1° libro di Madrigali a 6 voci, Venice, 1581 |
| 149 | 113v-114r | Luca Marenzio | Dice la mia bellissima Licori | SSATTB | Footnote: f.113v: "Marenzo" | Marenzio, Il 4° libro di Madrigali a 6 voci, Venice, 1587 |
| 150 | 113v-115r | Luca Marenzio | Occhi sereni e chiari | SSATTB | Footnote: f.115r: "Marenzo" | Marenzio, Il 1° libro di Madrigali a 6 voci, Venice, 1581 |
| 151 | 114r-116r | Luca Marenzio | Ne fero sdegno mai donna mi mosse | SSATTB | Footnote: f.116r: "Marenzo" | Marenzio, Il 4° libro di Madrigali a 6 voci, Venice, 1587 |
| 152 | 114v-116r | Luca Marenzio | Tal chè dovunque vo tutte repente | SSATTB | Footnote: f.116r: "Marenzo" | Marenzio, Il 4° libro di Madrigali a 6 voci, Venice, 1587 |
| 153 | 115v-117r | Luca Marenzio | Del Cibo onde il signor mio sempr'abonda | SAATTB | Footnote: f.116v: "Marenzo" | Marenzio, Il 2° libro di Madrigali a 6 voci, Venice, 1584 |
| 154 | 117v | Luca Marenzio | Con quella man che tanto [2e parte] | SAATTB | | Marenzio, Il 2° libro di Madrigali a 6 voci, Venice, 1584 |
| 155 | 118r | Luca Marenzio | Di lagrime, Indi sparge | SAATTB | | Marenzio, Il 3° libro di Madrigali a 6 voci, Venice, 1585 |
| 156 | 117v-118r | Luca Marenzio | Vattene anima mia | SSATTB | Footnote: f.118v: "Marenzo" | Marenzio, Il 4° libro di Madrigali a 6 voci, Venice, 1587 |
| 157 | 118v-119r | Luca Marenzio | Nel più fiorito Aprile | SAATTB | Footnote: f.119r: "Marenzo" | Marenzio, Il 1° libro di Madrigali a 6 voci, Venice, 1581 |
| 158 | 118v-119v | Luca Marenzio | La dipartita è amara | SAATTB | Footnote: f.119r: "Marenzo" | Marenzio, Il 4° libro di Madrigali a 6 voci, Venice, 1587 |
| 159 | 119r-120r | Luca Marenzio | Crudel perché mi fuggi | SSATTB | Footnote: f.120r: "Marenzo" | Marenzio, Il 4° libro di Madrigali a 6 voci, Venice, 1587 |
| 160 | 119v-120r | Luca Marenzio | Deh rinforzate il vostro largo pianto | SATTBB | Footnote: f.120r: "Marenzo" | Marenzio, Il 1° libro di Madrigali a 6 voci, Venice, 1581 |
| 161 | 120r-121r | Luca Marenzio | Parto da voi mio sole | SSATTB | Footnote: f.121r: "Marenzo" | Marenzio, Il 3° libro di Madrigali a 6 voci, Venice, 1585 |
| 162 | 120v-122r | Luca Marenzio | Non è questa la mano | SAATTB | Footnote: f.122r: "Marenzo" | Marenzio, Il 1° libro di Madrigali a 6 voci, Venice, 1581 |
| 163 | 121v-122r | Luca Marenzio | Come fuggir per selv'ombrosa e folta | SSAATB | Footnote: f.121v: "Marenzo" | Marenzio, Il 5° libro di Madrigali a 6 voci, Venice, 1591 |
| 164 | 122r-123r | Luca Marenzio | Ecco che 'l ciel a noi chiar'e sereno | SSATTB | Footnote: f.123r: "Marenzo" | Marenzio, Il 5° libro di Madrigali a 6 voci, Venice, 1591 |
| 165 | 122v-123v | Luca Marenzio | Ben mi credetti già d'esser felice | SATTTB | Footnote: f.123v: "Marenzo" | Marenzio, Il 1° libro di Madrigali a 6 voci, Venice, 1581 |
| 166 | 123v-124r | Luca Marenzio | Vaneggio od'è pur vero | SSATTB | Footnote: f.124r: "Marenzo" | Marenzio, Il 4° libro di Madrigali a 6 voci, Venice, 1587 |
| 167 | 123v-125r | Luca Marenzio | Mentre fia caldo il sol fredda la neve | ATTBBB | Footnote: f.125r: "Marenzo" | Marenzio, Il 1° libro di Madrigali a 6 voci, Venice, 1581 |
| 168 | 125v-127r | Anonymus | Laboravi in gemitu meo | SSATTB | Footnote: f.27r: "T. M. / incerto" | Add. 372–77 |
| 169 | 127v | Giacomo Aquilino Dano | Pavana | Viola da gamba | Footnote: At tail of f.127v: "Jacomo Aquilino Dano" | |
Madrigali a 6 di Pietro Philippi
| 170 | 128r-129r | Peter Philips | Lascian le fresche linfe | SSATTB | Footnote: f.128v: "Pietro Philippi" | Philips, Il 1° libro di Madrigali a 6 voci, Antwerp, 1596 |
| 171 | 128v-129r | Peter Philips | Sì mi dicesti | SSATTB | Footnote: f.127v: "Pietro Philippi" | Philips, Il 1° libro di Madrigali a 6 voci, Antwerp, 1596 |
| 172 | 128r-130r | Peter Philips | Il dolce mormorio | SSATTB | Footnote: f.130r: "Pietro Philippi" | Philips, Il 1° libro di Madrigali a 6 voci, Antwerp, 1596 |
| 173 | 129v-132r | Peter Philips | Amor di propria man | SSATTB | Footnote: f.130v: "Philippi" | Philips, Il 1° libro di Madrigali a 6 voci, Antwerp, 1596 |
| 174 | 133v | Peter Philips | La Ninfa albor con Voce [2e part] | SSATTB | | Philips, Il 1° libro di Madrigali a 6 voci, Antwerp, 1596 |
| 175 | 133v | Peter Philips | Cosi con lieto gioco [3e parte] | SSATTB | | Philips, Il 1° libro di Madrigali a 6 voci, Antwerp, 1596 |
| 176 | 131v-132r | Peter Philips | Baciai per haver vita | SSATTB | Footnote: f.131v: "Philippi" | Philips, Il 1° libro di Madrigali a 6 voci, Antwerp, 1596 |
| 177 | 131v-133r | Peter Philips | Baciai ma che mi valse | SSATTB | Footnote: f.133r: "Philippi" | Philips, Il 1° libro di Madrigali a 6 voci, Antwerp, 1596 |
| 178 | 132v-134r | Peter Philips | Apra la porta d'oro | SSATTB | Footnote: f.133v: "Philippi" | Philips, Il 1° libro di Madrigali a 6 voci, Antwerp, 1596 |
| 179 | 136v | Peter Philips | Quel mentre gir in torno [2e parte] | SSATTB | | Philips, Il 1° libro di Madrigali a 6 voci, Antwerp, 1596 |
| 180 | 133v-134v | Peter Philips | Poi che voi non volete | SSAATTB | Footnote: f.134v: "Philippi" | Philips, Il 1° libro di Madrigali a 6 voci, Antwerp, 1596 |
| 181 | 137v | Peter Philips | Io son ferito | SSAATTB | Footnote: f.136r: "Philippi" | Philips, Il 1° libro di Madrigali a 6 voci, Antwerp, 1596 |
| | | | 2° parte copied as 207 | | | |
| 182 | 138v | Peter Philips | Ut re mi fa sol la | SSAATTB | Footnote: f.136v: "Philippi" | Philips, Il 1° libro di Madrigali a 6 voci, Antwerp, 1596 |
| 183 | 136v-137r | Peter Philips | Qui sott'ombrosi mirti | SSAATTB | Footnote: f.136v: "Philippi" | Philips, Il 2° libro di Madrigali a 6 voci, Antwerp, 1603 |
| 184 | 136v-137v | Peter Philips | Scherza madonna e dice | SSAATTB | Footnote: f.137v: "Philippi" | Philips, Il 2° libro di Madrigali a 6 voci, Antwerp, 1603 |
| 185 | 137v-139r | Peter Philips | Era in acquario il sole | SSAATTB | Footnote: f.139r: "Philippi" | Philips, Il 2° libro di Madrigali a 6 voci, Antwerp, 1603 |
| 186 | 138v-139r | Peter Philips | Lasso non è morir | SSAATTB | Footnote: f.139r: "Philippi" | Philips, Il 2° libro di Madrigali a 6 voci, Antwerp, 1603 |
| 187 | 139r-140r | Peter Philips | Nero manto vi cinge | SSAATTB | Footnote: f.140r: "Philippi" | Philips, Il 2° libro di Madrigali a 6 voci, Antwerp, 1603 |
| 188 | 139v-141r | Peter Philips | Questa vita mortale | SSAATTB | Footnote: f.140v: "Philippi" | Philips, Il 2° libro di Madrigali a 6 voci, Antwerp, 1603 |
| 189 | 140v-142v | Peter Philips | Porta nel viso Aprile | SSAATTB | Footnote: f.141v: "Philippi" | Philips, Il 2° libro di Madrigali a 6 voci, Antwerp, 1603 |
| 190 | 144v | Peter Philips | Quando Vranio [2° parte] | SSAATTB | | Philips, Il 2° libro di Madrigali a 6 voci, Antwerp, 1603 |
| 191 | 144v | Peter Philips | E quando fra le [3° parte] | SSAATTB | | Philips, Il 2° libro di Madrigali a 6 voci, Antwerp, 1603 |
| 192 | 142v-143v | Peter Philips | Correa vezzosamente | SSAATTB | Footnote: f.143v: "Philippi" | Philips, Il 2° libro di Madrigali a 6 voci, Antwerp, 1603 |
| 193 | 143v-144r | Peter Philips | Deh ferma ferm' il tuo rubello | SSAATTB | Footnote: f.144r: "Pietro Philippi" | Philips, Il 2° libro di Madrigali a 6 voci, Antwerp, 1603 |
| 194 | 144r-145r | Peter Philips | Non è non è più cor | SSAATTB | Footnote: f.145r: "Philippi" | Philips, Il 2° libro di Madrigali a 6 voci, Antwerp, 1603 |
| 195 | 145r-146r | Peter Philips | Non è ferro che punga | SSAATTB | Footnote: f.146r: "Philippi" | Philips, Il 2° libro di Madrigali a 6 voci, Antwerp, 1603 |
| 196 | 145v-148v | Peter Philips | Chi vuol vedere un bosco | SSAATTB | Footnote: f.145v: "Philippi" | Philips, Il 2° libro di Madrigali a 6 voci, Antwerp, 1603 |
| 197 | 148v | Peter Philips | Chi vuol Vedere Vn Mare [2° parte] | SSAATTB | | Philips, Il 2° libro di Madrigali a 6 voci, Antwerp, 1603 |
| 198 | 149v | Peter Philips | Chi Vuol Veder l’Inferno [3° parte] | SSAATTB | | Philips, Il 2° libro di Madrigali a 6 voci, Antwerp, 1603 |
| 199 | 151r | Peter Philips | E chi saper desia [4° parte] | SSAATTB | | Philips, Il 2° libro di Madrigali a 6 voci, Antwerp, 1603 |
| 200 | 148v-149r | Peter Philips | Fece da voi partita | SSAATTB | Footnote: f.148v: "Philippi" | Philips, Il 1° libro di Madrigali a 6 voci, Antwerp, 1596 |
| 201 | 149r-150r | Peter Philips | Di perle lagrimose sparse | SSAATTB | Footnote: f.150r: "Philippi" | Philips, Il 1° libro di Madrigali a 6 voci, Antwerp, 1596 |
| 202 | 150r-150v | Peter Philips | Chi vi mira e non sospira | SSAATTB | Footnote: f.150r: "To the Quadro Pavan" | Philips, Il 1° libro di Madrigali a 6 voci, Antwerp, 1596 |
| 203 | 150v-151v | Peter Philips | Mentre hor humile | SSAATTB | Footnote: f.151v: "Philippi" | Philips, Il 1° libro di Madrigali a 6 voci, Antwerp, 1596 |
| 204 | 154r | Peter Philips | Mentre di doglia [2a parte] | SSAATTB | | Philips, Il 1° libro di Madrigali a 6 voci, Antwerp, 1596 |
| 205 | 151v-153r | Peter Philips | Cantai mentre dispiacqu'al mio bel sole | SSAATTB | Footnote: f.151v: "Philippi" | Philips, Il 1° libro di Madrigali a 6 voci, Antwerp, 1596 |
| 206 | 155r | Peter Philips | Resto qual huom [2° parte] | SSAATTB | | Philips, Il 1° libro di Madrigali a 6 voci, Antwerp, 1596 |
| 207 | 156r | Peter Philips | S’io t’ho ferito (see 181) | SSAATTB | | Philips, Il 1° libro di Madrigali a 6 voci, Antwerp, 1596 |
| 208 | 154v-155v | Peter Philips | Pavan Passamezzo | Viola da gamba | Footnote: Concordances in GB-Ob, Ms. Mus. Sch. E.437–42, and GB-Och, MS 423–8 | Bodleian Library Oxford MSS E. 437–42, Christ Church, Oxford MSS 423–28 |
Madrigali a 6 di diversei Authori
| 209 | 156r-157r | Alessandro Striggio | Nasce la pena mia | SAATTB | Footnote: f.157r: "Alessandro Strigio" | Striggio, Il 1° libro di Madrigali a 6 voci, Venice, 1566 |
| 210 | 156v-157r | Alessandro Striggio | Questi ch'indicio fan | SSAATTB | Footnote: f.157r: "Alessandro Strigio" | Striggio, Il 2° libro di Madrigali a 6 voci, Venice, 1571 |
| 211 | 157r-158r | Alessandro Striggio | Partirò dunque et perchè mi s'asconde | SSATTT | Footnote: f.158r: "Alessandro Striggio" | Striggio, Il 2° libro di Madrigali a 6 voci, Venice, 1571 |
| 212 | 157v-159r | Alessandro Striggio | Dolce mio ben amor | SSAATTB | Footnote: f.159r: "Alessandro Striggio" | Striggio, Il 2° libro di Madrigali a 6 voci, Venice, 1571 |
| 213 | 158v-160r | Alessandro Striggio | Alma che da celeste | SATTTB | Footnote: f.160r: "Alessandro Striggio" | Striggio, Il 2° libro di Madrigali a 6 voci, Venice, 1571 |
| 214 | 159v-160r | Alessandro Striggio | Amor m'impenna l'ale | SAATTB | Footnote: f.160r: "Alessandro Striggio" | Striggio, Il 2° libro di Madrigali a 6 voci, Venice, 1571 |
| 215 | 160v-161r | Alessandro Striggio | All'acqua sagra | SSATTB | Footnote: f.160v: "Alessandro Striggio" | Striggio, Il 2° libro di Madrigali a 6 voci, Venice, 1571 |
| 216 | 160v-162r | Alessandro Striggio | Hor se mi mostra | SAATTB | Footnote: f.161v: "Alessandro Striggio" | Striggio, Il 2° libro di Madrigali a 6 voci, Venice, 1571 |
| 217 | 166r | Alessandro Striggio | Sento venir per [2° parte] | SAATTB | | Striggio, Il 2° libro di Madrigali a 6 voci, Venice, 1571 |
| 218 | 161v-163r | Giuseppe Biffi | Ecco che pur vi lascio | SSATTB | Footnote: f.163r: "Joseppo Biffi" | Striggio, Il 3° libro di Madrigali a 6 voci, Venice, 1600 |
| 219 | 162v-163r | Francesco Rovigo | Liete le muse al'ombra | SSATTB | Footnote: f.162v: "Francesco Rivigo / piglia il lauro per la / tua Laura" | Il lauro verdi, Ferrara, 1583 |
| 220 | 163r-164r | Felice Anerio | Hor che l'aura tranquilla | SSATTB | Footnote: f.164r: "Felice Anerio" | Anerio, Il 1° libro di Madrigali a 6 voci, Venice 1590 |
| 221 | 163v-164r | Felice Anerio | L'aura che noi circonda | SSAATB | Footnote: f.164r: "Felice Anerio" | Anerio, Il 1° libro di Madrigali a 6 voci, Venice 1590 |
| 222 | 164v-165r | Felice Anerio | Dolcissimo riposo | SSATTB | Footnote: f.164v: "Felice Anerio" | Anerio, Il 1° libro di Madrigali a 6 voci, Venice 1590 |
| 223 | 164v-165v | Felice Anerio | Questa che 'l cor m'ancide | SSATTB | Footnote: f.165v: "Felice Anerio" | Anerio, Il 1° libro di Madrigali a 6 voci, Venice 1590 |
| 224 | 165v-167r | Felice Anerio | Riser le piagge | SSATTB | Footnote: f.166v: "Felice Anerio" | Anerio, Il 1° libro di Madrigali a 6 voci, Venice 1590 |
| 225 | 170v | Felice Anerio | Non posso piu negar [2° parte] | SSATTB | | Anerio, Il 1° libro di Madrigali a 6 voci, Venice 1590 |
| 226 | 166v-167v | Felice Anerio | Non potean vinti dal soverchio lume | SSATTB | Footnote: Music incipit transcribed as written in the ms | Anerio, Il 1° libro di Madrigali a 6 voci, Venice 1590 |
| 227 | 167v-168r | Felice Anerio | Come potrò giammai finir | SSATTB | Footnote: f.167v: "Felice Anerio" | Anerio, Il 1° libro di Madrigali a 6 voci, Venice 1590 |
| 228 | 167v-169r | Felice Anerio | Pensai lasso ma invano | SSATTB | Footnote: f.169r: "Felice Anerio" | Anerio, Il 1° libro di Madrigali a 6 voci, Venice 1590 |
| 229 | 168v-169v | Felice Anerio | Come ne caldi estivi | SSATTB | Footnote: f.169v: "Felice Anerio" | Anerio, Il 1° libro di Madrigali a 6 voci, Venice 1590 |
| 230 | 169v-173v | Felice Anerio | Già disfatto ha le nevi intorno | SSATTB | Footnote: f.170v: "Felice Anerio" | Anerio, Il 1° libro di Madrigali a 6 voci, Venice 1590 |
| 231 | 175r | Felice Anerio | Esser non puo [2a parte] | SSATTB | | Anerio, Il 1° libro di Madrigali a 6 voci, Venice 1590 |
| 232 | 174v | Felice Anerio | L’non hebbi giamai [3° parte] | SSATTB | | Anerio, Il 1° libro di Madrigali a 6 voci, Venice 1590 |
| 233 | 176r | Felice Anerio | O belta senza essempio [4° parte] | SSATTB | | Anerio, Il 1° libro di Madrigali a 6 voci, Venice 1590 |
| 234 | 176r | Felice Anerio | Corran da gl’occhi miei [5° parte] | SSATTB | | Anerio, Il 1° libro di Madrigali a 6 voci, Venice 1590 |
| 235 | 176v | Felice Anerio | Ma di stara vedra [6° parte] | SSATTB | | Anerio, Il 1° libro di Madrigali a 6 voci, Venice 1590 |
| 236 | 178r | Felice Anerio | Io mi distruggo [7° parte] | SSATTB | | Anerio, Il 1° libro di Madrigali a 6 voci, Venice 1590 |
| 237 | 173r-175r | Orlando di Lasso | S'io esca vivo | SSAATB | Footnote: f.175r: "Orlando di Lassus" | Nverdi d'Orfeo, Leiden, 1605 |
| 238 | 174v-175r | Andrea Gabrieli | Io no piangendo i miei passati tempi | SAATTB | Footnote: f.175r: "Andrea Gabrieli" | Gabrieli, Canto Concerti di Andrea et di Gio. Gabrieli, Venice 1597 |
| 239 | 175r-177r | Benedetto Pallavicino | Tirsi morir volea | SSATTB | Footnote: f.175v: "Benedetto Pallavicino" | Pallavicino, Il 1° libro di Madrigali a 5 voci, Venice, 1581 |
| 240 | 179v | Benedetto Pallavicino | Freno Tirsi [2° parte] | SSATTB | | Pallavicino, Il 1° libro di Madrigali a 5 voci, Venice, 1581 |
| 241 | 180r | Benedetto Pallavicino | Cosi moriro [3° parte] | SSATTB | | Pallavicino, Il 1° libro di Madrigali a 5 voci, Venice, 1581 |
| 242 | 176v-178v | Benedetto Pallavicino | In dir che sete bella | SSATTB | Footnote: f.177r: "Benedetto Pallavicino" | Pallavicino, Il 2° libro di Madrigali a 5 voci, Venice, 1606 |
| 243 | 180v | Benedetto Pallavicino | I capei de l’Aurora [2° parte] | SSATTB | | Pallavicino, Il 2° libro di Madrigali a 5 voci, Venice, 1606 |
| 244 | 177v-178r | Benedetto Pallavicino | Occhi leggiadri e belli | SSATTB | Footnote: f.178r: "Benedetto Pallavicino" | Pallavicino, Il 1° libro di Madrigali a 5 voci, Venice, 1581 |
| 245 | 178r-179r | Benedetto Pallavicino | Chi vi bascia e vi morde | SSATTB | Footnote: f.179r: "Benedetto Pallavicino" | Pallavicino, Il 1° libro di Madrigali a 5 voci, Venice, 1581 |
| 246 | 178v-179v | Benedetto Pallavicino | Donna gentile e bella | SSATTB | Footnote: f.179r: "Benedetto Pallavicino" | Pallavicino, Il 1° libro di Madrigali a 5 voci, Venice, 1581 |
| 247 | 179v-180r | Benedetto Pallavicino | Aventurose spoglie | SSATTB | Footnote: f.180r: "Benedetto Pallavicino" | Pallavicino, Il 1° libro di Madrigali a 5 voci, Venice, 1581 |
| 248 | 179v-180v | Benedetto Pallavicino | Deh scema il foco | SSATTB | Footnote: f.180v: "Benedetto Pallavicino" | Pallavicino, Il 1° libro di Madrigali a 5 voci, Venice, 1581 |
| 249 | 180v-181r | Benedetto Pallavicino | Crudel perché mi fuggi | SSATTB | Footnote: f.180v: "Benedetto Pallavicino" | Pallavicino, Il 1° libro di Madrigali a 5 voci, Venice, 1581 |
| 250 | 180v-182r | Benedetto Pallavicino | Parte la vita mia | SSATTB | Footnote: f.182r: "Benedetto Pallavicino" | Pallavicino, Il 1° libro di Madrigali a 5 voci, Venice, 1581 |
| 251 | 181v-182v | Benedetto Pallavicino | I lieti amanti | SSATTB | Footnote: f.182v: "Benedetto Pallavicino" | Pallavicino, Il 1° libro di Madrigali a 5 voci, Venice, 1581 |
| 252 | 182v-183r | Benedetto Pallavicino | In boschi Ninfa | SSATTB | Footnote: f.182v: "Benedetto Pallavicino" | Pallavicino, Il 1° libro di Madrigali a 5 voci, Venice, 1581 |
| 253 | 182v-184r | Benedetto Pallavicino | Vaga scopre Diana | SSAATB | Footnote: f.184r: "Benedetto Pallavicino" | Pallavicino, Il 1° libro di Madrigali a 5 voci, Venice, 1581 |
| 254 | 187v | Benedetto Pallavicino | Cosi fors’o mia Dea | SSAATB | | Pallavicino, Il 1° libro di Madrigali a 5 voci, Venice, 1581 |
| 255 | 184r-185r | Benedetto Pallavicino | Partomi donna | SSAATB | Footnote: f.185r: "Benedetto Pallavicino" | Pallavicino, Il 1° libro di Madrigali a 5 voci, Venice, 1581 |
| 256 | 184v-185v | Benedetto Pallavicino | Gentil pastor che miri | SSAATB | Footnote: f.185v: "Benedetto Pallavicino" | Pallavicino, Il 1° libro di Madrigali a 5 voci, Venice, 1581 |
| 257 | 185v-189r | Benedetto Pallavicino | Ohimè e come puoi tu senza me morire | SSATTB | Footnote: f.185v: "Benedetto Pallavicino" | Pallavicino, Il 1° libro di Madrigali a 5 voci, Venice, 1581 |
| 258 | 185v-186v | Benedetto Pallavicino | Rose gittommi al viso | SSAATB | Footnote: f.186v: "Benedetto Pallavicino" | Pallavicino, Il 1° libro di Madrigali a 5 voci, Venice, 1581 |
| 259 | 186v-187r | Benedetto Pallavicino | Vorrei mostrar Madonna | SSAATB | Footnote: f.187v: "Benedetto Pallavicino" | Pallavicino, Il 1° libro di Madrigali a 5 voci, Venice, 1581 |
| 260 | 187v-188r | Benedetto Pallavicino | Bene mio tu m'hai lasciato | SSATTB | Footnote: f.188r: "Benedetto Pallavicino" | Pallavicino, Il 1° libro di Madrigali a 5 voci, Venice, 1581 |
| 261 | 187v-189r | Benedetto Pallavicino | Deh’ perché lagrimar | SSAATB | Footnote: f.189r: "Benedetto Pallavicino" | Pallavicino, Il 1° libro di Madrigali a 5 voci, Venice, 1581 |
| 262 | 188v-190v | Benedetto Pallavicino | Nel dolce seno | SSATTB | Footnote: f.189r: "Benedetto Pallavicino" | Pallavicino, Il 1° libro di Madrigali a 5 voci, Venice, 1581 |
| 263 | 193r | Benedetto Pallavicino | Quand’ ella Ahime [2° parte] | SSATTB | | Pallavicino, Il 1° libro di Madrigali a 5 voci, Venice, 1581 |
| 264 | 194r | Benedetto Pallavicino | O fortunati [3° parte] | SSATTB | | Pallavicino, Il 1° libro di Madrigali a 5 voci, Venice, 1581 |
| 265 | 190v-191r | Benedetto Pallavicino | Sedea fra gigli e rose | SSATTB | Footnote: f.190v: "Benedetto Pallavicino" | Madrigali pastorali, Venice 1594 |
| 266 | 190v-192r | Rinaldo del Mel | La bella chioma d'or puro | SSATTB | Footnote: f.191v: "Rinaldo del Mel" | Del Mel, Il 2° libro di Madrigali a 6 voci, Venice, 1593 |
| 267 | 195v | Rinaldo del Mel | Le belle mani [2° parte] | SSATTB | | Del Mel, Il 2° libro di Madrigali a 6 voci, Venice, 1593 |
| 268 | 191v-193v | Rinaldo del Mel | Sovra le verdi chiome | SSATTB | Footnote: f.193r: "Rinaldo del Mel" | Del Mel, Il 3° libro di Madrigali a 6 voci, Venice, 1595 |
| 269 | 197r | Rinaldo del Mel | El altri vezzosetti [2° parte] | SSATTB | | Del Mel, Il 3° libro di Madrigali a 6 voci, Venice, 1595 |
| 270 | 192v-193v | Rinaldo del Mel | Poi che del mio gran stratio | SSATTB | Footnote: f.193v: "Rinaldo del Mel" | Del Mel, Il 2° libro di Madrigali a 6 voci, Venice, 1593 |
| 271 | 193v-198v | Rinaldo del Mel | Stando in un giorno solo a la fenestra | SSATTB | Footnote: f.193v: "Rinaldo del Mel" | Del Mel, Il 2° libro di Madrigali a 6 voci, Venice, 1593 |
| 272 | 198r | Rinaldo del Mel | In di per altro mar [2° parte] | SSATTB | | Del Mel, Il 2° libro di Madrigali a 6 voci, Venice, 1593 |
| 273 | 199r | Rinaldo del Mel | In un boschett [3° parte] | SSATTB | | Del Mel, Il 2° libro di Madrigali a 6 voci, Venice, 1593 |
| 274 | 200r | Rinaldo del Mel | Chiara fontan’in [4° parte] | SSATTB | | Del Mel, Il 2° libro di Madrigali a 6 voci, Venice, 1593 |
| 275 | 200v | Rinaldo del Mel | Una strania Fenice [5° parte] | SSATTB | | Del Mel, Il 2° libro di Madrigali a 6 voci, Venice, 1593 |
| 276 | 200v | Rinaldo del Mel | Al fin Vid’io per [6° parte] | SSATTB | | Del Mel, Il 2° libro di Madrigali a 6 voci, Venice, 1593 |
| 277 | 201v | Rinaldo del Mel | Canzon tu poi [7° parte] | SSATTB | | Del Mel, Il 2° libro di Madrigali a 6 voci, Venice, 1593 |
| 278 | 197v-199r | Rinaldo del Mel | Infelice mio core | SSATTB | Footnote: f.199r: "Rinaldo de Mel" | Del Mel, Il 2° libro di Madrigali a 6 voci, Venice, 1593 |
| 279 | 203r | Rinaldo del Mel | Ahi fiera e triste [2° parte] | SSATTB | | Del Mel, Il 2° libro di Madrigali a 6 voci, Venice, 1593 |
| 280 | 198v-200r | Rinaldo del Mel | Asiso sovra un sasso giovenetto | SSATTB | Footnote: f.200r: "Rinaldo del Mel" | Del Mel, Il 2° libro di Madrigali a 6 voci, Venice, 1593 |
| 281 | 199v-200r | Giulio Eremita | Arsi del vostr'amor sì dolcemente | SSATTB | Footnote: f.200r: "Guilio Heremita" | Eremita, Il 1° libro di Madrigali a 6 voci, Ferrara, 1584 |
| 282 | 200v-201r | Giulio Eremita | I vaghi fiori e l'herb'e | SSATTB | Footnote: f.201r: "Giulio Heremita" | Eremita, Il 1° libro di Madrigali a 6 voci, Ferrara, 1584 |
| 283 | 200v-202r | Giulio Eremita | Donna felice e bella | SSATTB | Footnote: f.202r: "Giulio Heremita" | Eremita, Il 1° libro di Madrigali a 6 voci, Ferrara, 1584 |
| 284 | 201v-202v | Giulio Eremita | Poi che 'l mio largo pianto | SSATTB | Footnote: f.202r: "Giulio Heremita" | Eremita, Il 1° libro di Madrigali a 6 voci, Ferrara, 1584 |
| 285 | 201v-202v | Giulio Eremita | Amor se de begl'occhi | SSATTB | Footnote: f.202v: "Giulio Heremita" | Eremita, Il 1° libro di Madrigali a 6 voci, Ferrara, 1584 |
| 286 | 202v-203v | Agostino Agazzari | La mia stellina d'oro | SSATTB | Footnote: f.203r: "Agostino Agazzari" | Agazzari, Il 1° libro di Madrigali a 6 voci, Venice, 1596 |
| 287 | 207r | Agostino Agazzari | E mentre per uscir [2° parte] | SSATTB | | Agazzari, Il 1° libro di Madrigali a 6 voci, Venice, 1596 |
| 288 | 203v-204r | Agostino Agazzari | Care lagrime mie | SSATTB | Footnote: f.204r: "Agostino Agazzari" | Agazzari, Il 1° libro di Madrigali a 6 voci, Venice, 1596 |
| 289 | 204r-204v | Agostino Agazzari | Parto da voi mio ardore | SSATTB | Footnote: f.205r: "Agostino Agazzari" | Agazzari, Il 1° libro di Madrigali a 6 voci, Venice, 1596 |
| 290 | 204v-205v | Agostino Agazzari | D'amoroso gioir avidi i petti | SSATTB | Footnote: f.205v: "Agostino Agazzari" | Agazzari, Il 1° libro di Madrigali a 6 voci, Venice, 1596 |
| 291 | 205v-206r | Agostino Agazzari | Hor benevenuto è maggio | SSATTB | Footnote: f.205v: "Agostino Agazzari" | Agazzari, Il 1° libro di Madrigali a 6 voci, Venice, 1596 |
| 292 | 205v-206v | Giovanni Francesco Anerio | Mentre dai vaghi fiori | SSATTB | Footnote: f.206v: "Gio. Francesco Anerio" | Il Parnasso, Antwerp, 1613 |
| 293 | 206v-208r | Thomaso Giglio | Calda pioggia di perle lagrimose | SSATTB | Footnote: f.207r: "Thomaso Giglio" | Il Parnasso, Antwerp, 1613 |
| 294 | 211v | Thomaso Giglio | Va in pace anima [2° parte] | SSATTB | | Il Parnasso, Antwerp, 1613 |
| 295 | 207v-209r | Scipione Spaventa | Quando fra belle ninfe | SSATTB | Footnote: f.209r: "Scipione Spavento" | Il Parnasso, Antwerp, 1613 |
| 296 | 208v-209r | Antonio il Verso | Deh se mostrar tue | SSATTB | Footnote: f.208v: "Antonio il Verso" | Il Parnasso, Antwerp, 1613 |
| 297 | 208v-209v | Antonio il Verso | Se qual dolor che va inanzi al morire | SSATTB | Footnote: f.209: "Antonio il Verso" | Il Parnasso, Antwerp, 1613 |
| 298 | 209v-210r | Vincenzo Passerini | Ahi chi mi porge | SSATTB | Footnote: f.209v: "Vincenzo Passerini" | Il Parnasso, Antwerp, 1613 |
| 299 | 209v-210v | Thomaso Giglio | Che soave concento fa 'l mormorar de l'onde | SSATTB | Footnote: f.210v: "Tomaso Giglio" | Il Parnasso, Antwerp, 1613 |
| 300 | 210v-211v | Giovanni Battista Locatello | Già primavera di vari colori | SSATTB | Footnote: f.211v: "Gio. Battista Lucatello" | Il lauro verdi, Ferrara, 1583 |
| 301 | 211v-212r | Giovanni de Macque | Io vidi amor | SSATTB | Footnote: f.211v: "Giovanni di Marque" | Il lauro verdi, Ferrara, 1583 |
| 302 | 211v-213r | Lelio Bertani | La giovinetta scorza | SSATTB | Footnote: f.213r: "Lelio Bertani" | Il lauro verdi, Ferrara, 1583 |
| 303 | 212v-214r | Antonio Orlandini | Chi vuol vedere | SSATTB | Footnote: f.214r: "Antonio Orlandini" | Il lauro verdi, Ferrara, 1583 |
| 304 | 213v-214v | Benedetto Pallavicino | Ninfe leggiadr' e voi alma pastori | SSATTB | Footnote: f.214r: "Giaches de Vuert" | Il lauro verdi, Ferrara, 1583 |
| 305 | 214r-215r | Annibale Stabile | Verde lauro gentil | SSATTB | Footnote: f.215r: "Annibal Stabile" | Il lauro verdi, Ferrara, 1583 |
| 306 | 214r-216r | Leonardo Meldert | Cresci bel verde | SSATTB | Footnote: f.216r: "Leonardo Meldert" | Il lauro verdi, Ferrara, 1583 |
| 307 | 215v-216r | Alessandro Milleville | Mentre io fuggia schernito | SSATTB | Footnote: f.216r: "Alessandro Milleville" | Il lauro verdi, Ferrara, 1583 |
| 308 | 216r-217r | Giovanni Battista Moscaglia | Del secco incolto lauro fuggite | SSATTB | Footnote: f.216v: "Gio Battista Moscaglia" | Il lauro verdi, Ferrara, 1583 |
| 309 | 216r-217r | Paolo Bellasio | Amor che vide | SSATTB | Footnote: f.217r: "Paolo Bellasio" | Il lauro verdi, Ferrara, 1583 |
| 310 | 217v-218r | Ippolito Baccusi | Fuggendo i rai colenti | SSATTB | Footnote: f.218r: "Hippolito Baccusio" | Il lauro verdi, Ferrara, 1583 |
| 310 | 217v-219r | Lelio Bertani | Et arde ad Amaranta | SSATTB | Footnote: f.219r: "Lelio Bertani" | [LISTED IN PERSONS] |
| 311 | 221v | Lelio Bertani | Siede negl’occhi Amore | SSATTB | | [NOT IN PERSONS] |
| 312 | 218v-219r | Marc'Antonio Ingegneri | La vaga pastorella | SSATTB | Footnote: f.219r: "Marc' Antonio Ingengeri" | Madrigali pastorali, Venice 1594 |
| 313 | 219r-219v | Cornelis Verdonck | Laura con armonia | SSATTB | Footnote: f.219v: "Cornelio Verdoncg" | Ghirlanda di madrigali, Antwerp, 1601 |
| 314 | 219v-221r | Giovanni Croce | Chi crederia ch'al varco | SSATTB | Footnote: f.220v: "Giovanni Croce" | Ghirlanda di madrigali, Antwerp, 1601 |
| 315 | 220v-221v | Giovanni Giacomo Gastoldi | Son questi ohimè dal core | SSATTB | Footnote: f.222r: "Gio. Giacomo Gastoldi" | Ghirlanda di madrigali, Antwerp, 1601 |
| 316 | 221v-223r | Rinaldo del Mel | Sorgea l'aurora e l'herbe | SSATTB | Footnote: f.222r: "Rinaldo del Mel" | Ghirlanda di madrigali, Antwerp, 1601 |
| 317 | 226r | Rinaldo del Mel | Fillida mea [2° parte] | SSATTB | | Ghirlanda di madrigali, Antwerp, 1601 |
| 318 | 226v | Ippolito Baccusi | Solo e pensoso i più deserti campi | SSATTB | Footnote: f.223v: "Hippolito Baccusi" | Ghirlanda di madrigali, Antwerp, 1601 |
| 319 | 227v | Ippolito Baccusi | Si ch’io mi cred’ [2° parte] | SSATTB | | Ghirlanda di madrigali, Antwerp, 1601 |
| 320 | 223v-225r | Lelio Bertani | Già fu mia dolce speme | SSATTB | Footnote: f.225r: "Lelio Bertani" | Ghirlanda di madrigali, Antwerp, 1601 |
| 321 | 224v-226r | Ippolito Baccusi | Occhi miei che Vedesti | SSATTB | Footnote: f.225r: "Hippoliti Baccusi" | Ghirlanda di madrigali, Antwerp, 1601 |
| 322 | 229r | Ippolito Baccusi | Care lagrime mie [2° parte] | SSATTB | | Ghirlanda di madrigali, Antwerp, 1601 |
| 323 | 225v-227r | Ippolito Sabino | Ahi crud'amor se 'l pianto | SSATTB | Footnote: f.227r: "Hippolito Sabino" | Sabino, Il 7° libro di Madrigali a 6 voci, Venice, 1589 |
| 324 | 226v-227v | Giovanni de Macque | Deh non più stral'amor | SSATTB | Footnote: f.227r: "Giovanni di Macque" | Macque, Il 2° libro di Madrigali a 6 voci, Venice 1582 |
| 325 | 226v-227v | Giovanni de Macque | Amor io sent'un respirar sì dolce | SSATTB | Footnote: f.227v: "Giovanni di Macque" | Macque, Il 2° libro di Madrigali a 6 voci, Venice 1582 |
| 326 | 227v-228r | Ippolito Baccusi | Un Giorno a Pale sacro | SSATTB | Footnote: f.227v: "Hippolito Baccusi" | Il Trionfo di Dori, Venice, 1592 |
| 327 | 227v-228v | Orazio Tiberio Vecchi | Hor ch'ogni vento tace | SSATTB | Footnote: f.228v: "Horatio Vecchi" | Vecchi, Vonvito musicale, Venice, 1597 |
| 328 | 228v-229r | Tiburtio Massaini | Su le fiorite sponde | SSATTB | Footnote: f.229r: "Tiburtio Massaino" | Il trionfo di dori, Venice, 1592 |
| 329 | 228r-230r | Giovanni Gabrieli | Se cantano gl'augelli | SSATTB | Footnote: f.229v: "Gio. Gabrieli" | Nervi d'Orfeo, Leiden, 1605 |
| 330 | 229v-230v | Giulio Eremita | Smerald'eran le riv' | SSATTB | Footnote: f.230v: "Giulo Eremita" | Il trionfo di dori, Venice, 1592 |
| 331 | 230v-231r | Giovanni Croce | Ove tra l'herbe | SSATTB | Footnote: f.231r: "Giovanni Croce" | Il trionfo di dori, Venice, 1592 |
| 332 | 230v-232r | Leone Leoni | Di pastorali accenti | SSATTB | Footnote: f.232r: "Leon Leoni" | Il trionfo di dori, Venice, 1592 |
| 333 | 231v-232r | Costanzo Porta | Da lo spuntar de matutini alberi | SSATTB | Footnote: f.232r: "Costanzo Porta" | Il trionfo di dori, Venice, 1592 |
| 334 | 232r-233r | Giovanni Cavaccio | Giunta qui Dori e pastorelli | SSATTB | Footnote: f.232v: "Giovanni Cavaccio" | Il trionfo di dori, Venice, 1592 |
| 335 | 232v-233v | John Coprario | Al folgorante sguardo | SSATTB | Footnote: f.233v: "Giovanni / Coprario" | |
| 336 | 233v-234v | John Coprario | Ah quelle labbra | SSATTB | Footnote: f.234r: "Giovanni Coprario" | |
| 337 | 234r-235r | William Byrd | Christ rising againe from the dead | SSATTB | Footnote: f.234v: "William Byrd" | Byrd, Songs of Sundry Nature, London, 1589 |
| 338 | 234v-236r | William Byrd | Christ is risen [2nd part] | SSATTB | Footnote: f.236r: "William Byrd. published in 1589" | Byrd, Songs of Sundry Nature, London, 1589 |
Madrigali a 8 di Pietro Philippi
| 339 | 237r-238r | Peter Philips | Questa che co' begl'occhi | SSATTB | Footnote: f.237v: "P. Philippi" | Philips, Madrigali a 8 voci, Antwerp, 1598 |
| 340 | 237v-239v | Peter Philips | Come potrò giammai | SSAATTBB | Footnote: f.239v: "P. Philippi" | Philips, Madrigali a 8 voci, Antwerp, 1598 |
| 341 | 239v-240v | Peter Philips | Hor che dal sonno vinta | SSAATTBB | Footnote: f.240v: "P. Philippi" | Philips, Madrigali a 8 voci, Antwerp, 1598 |
| 342 | 240v-242v | Peter Philips | Donna mi fugg'ogn'hora | SSAATTBB | Footnote: f.242v: "P. Philippi" | Philips, Madrigali a 8 voci, Antwerp, 1598 |
| 343 | 242v-244r | Peter Philips | Se per gridar ohimè | SSAATTBB | Footnote: f.243v: "P. Philippi" | Philips, Madrigali a 8 voci, Antwerp, 1598 |
| 344 | 243v-248r | Peter Philips | Filli leggiadra e bella | SSAATTBB | Footnote: f.246v: "Pietro Philippi" | Philips, Madrigali a 8 voci, Antwerp, 1598 |
| 345 | 249r | Peter Philips | Mesta qui l’aria [2nd part] | SSAATTBB | | Philips, Madrigali a 8 voci, Antwerp, 1598 |
| 346 | 250v | Peter Philips | Deh torna Filli, torna [3° parte] | SSAATTBB | | Philips, Madrigali a 8 voci, Antwerp, 1598 |
| 347 | 252r | Peter Philips | Ben restaro le piante [5° parte] | SSAATTBB | | Philips, Madrigali a 8 voci, Antwerp, 1598 |
| 348 | 249r | Peter Philips | Passando con pensier | SSAATTBB | Footnote: Incomplete: 1 line, top four parts only, no text | Philips, Madrigali a 8 voci, Antwerp, 1598 |
Madrigale a 10 di Luca Marenzio
| 349 | 249v-251r | Luca Marenzio | Basti fin qui le pen'e i duri affanni | SSAATTTTBB | Footnote: Incomplete: f.249–251 damaged | Marenzio, Madrigali a quatro, cinque et sei voci (Venice, 1588 |
| 350 | 251v | [unidentified] | Laus honor | SSAATTB | Footnote: The piece is on a piece of paper pasted on the lower cover, upside down | |

== See also ==
- Francis Tregian the Younger

== Works consulted ==
- Carter, Tim (1988), "Caccini's 'Amarilli, mia bella:' Some Questions (And a Few Answers)", Journal of the Royal Musical Association, 13 (2): 250–273, doi:10.1093/jrma/113.2.250, JSTOR 766361 (JSTOR access by subscription)
- Charteris, Richard (1982), "Autographs of Alfonso Ferrabosco I-III", Early Music, 10 (2): 208–11, doi:10.1093/earlyj/10.2.208, JSTOR 3126888 (JSTOR access by subscription)
- Cole, Elizabeth (1951), "In Search of Francis Tregian", Music & Letters, 33: 28–32, doi:10.1093/ml/xxxiii.1.28
- Drexel 4302, New York: New York Public Library, 1946, OCLC 79460844
- Lowinsky, Edward E. (1960), "Early Scores in Manuscript", Journal of the American Musicological Society, 13 (1/3): 126–173, doi:10.2307/830252, JSTOR 830252 (JSTOR access by subscription)
- Persons, Jerry C. (1969). The Sambrooke Book: Drexel 4302 (M.M. thesis). Wichita State University. OCLC 18307425.
- Schofield, Bertram; Dart, Thurston (1951), "Tregian's Anthology", Music & Letters, 32 (3): 205–16, doi:10.1093/ml/xxxii.3.205
- Smith, David J. (2002), "A legend? Francis Tregian the Younger as music copyist", Musical Times, 143 (1879): 7–16, doi:10.2307/1004593, JSTOR 1004593 (JSTOR access by subscription)
- Thompson, Ruby Reid (1992), "The 'Tregian' Manuscripts: A Study of Their Compilation" (PDF), British Library Journal, 18 (2): 202–204
- Thompson, Ruby Reid (2001), "Francis Tregian the Younger as Music Copyist: A Legend and an Alternative View", Music and Letters, 82 (1): 1–31, doi:10.1093/ml/82.1.1, JSTOR 3526454 (JSTOR access by subscription)
