= Francis Tregian the Younger =

Cornish recusant (c. 1574–1618)

Francis Tregian the Younger (c. 1574–1618) was a Cornish recusant. Once thought to have been the copyist of a handful of important music manuscripts, his musical activities are the subject of dispute.

== Biography ==
Francis Tregian was the son of Francis Tregian the Elder and Mary Stourton. He is thought to have been born in about 1574. (The birth year is derived from a household list drawn up in 1594 at the death of his teacher William Allen which referred to Tregian as being 20 years old: "molto nobile, di 20 anni, se colare di ingennio delicessimo dotto in filosofia, in musica et nella lingua latina." Not only is this the only document suggesting his age but it is also the only document associating him with music.) In 1577 his father was arrested for being a Roman Catholic and sheltering priests. He was imprisoned and dispossessed, and the Tregian family had to leave their manor house in Probus, Cornwall.

Tregian's mother and her children travelled 200 miles to London. She hoped that her brother John Stourton, 9th Baron Stourton, could intercede for her husband. She lodged in Clerkenwell with her mother, who had remarried after her father's death (her father had been executed). She eventually moved to her husband's prison.

The younger Tregian was sent to France sometime between 1582 and 1586. Despite a statute enacted in 1585 by Queen Elizabeth I which levied a penalty on religious dissidents who sent their children to school overseas, on 29 September 1586, he entered the English College in Douai, a stronghold of Roman Catholicism. As fees had to be paid in advance, Persons surmises that the elder Tregian arranged payment of fees in advance with the college's agent based in London. At the English College he probably undertook the typical course of study required of all beginning students which included Latin and Greek literature and grammar. Persons notes there was no evidence of Tregian's possible musical training at the English College. The younger Tregian apparently did well; he was chosen to give the congratulatory address to the Bishop of Piacenza on the latter's visit in 1591.

He obtained a position as chamberlain to Cardinal William Allen, and left for Rome on 11 July 1592 (It was once thought that Tregian encountered the composer Peter Philips who was serving William Allen in Rome. But Philips's stay in Rome was from 1582 to 1585, well before Tregian graduated the English College at Douai.) On Allen's death in 1594 Tregian appears to have gone to Brussels. A document from 1603 acknowledges Tregian as "being with the Archduke" there (the archduke being Archduke Albert). In an attempt to find a musical association, Persons notes that composer Peter Philips was the court organist to Archduke Albert from 1597 until after 1610 and that during the time Tregian was also associated with the Archduke, the two might have come into contact.

The situation of the Tregian family improved somewhat when James I came to the throne. The elder Tregian was released from prison and went into exile. It is known the younger Tregian was still in Brussels in 1606 when his father visited. Also in 1606 the younger Tregian returned to England to reclaim his father's estates. Existing documents show that he purchased an interest in his family estate, the manor house "Golden" together with surrounding lands, from Elizabeth Spencer for £6500 in 1607. The earliest record of his being convicted of recusancy is dated 7 July 1607 where the proceeds of his conviction are given to George Bland. The elder Tregian died in 1608. By September the Crown had seized two-thirds of the Tregian property as a fine for recusancy.

By 1608–1609 he was imprisoned in Fleet Prison in London. Documents as to the actual cause of his incarceration are lacking, but Persons, citing Boyan, appears to believe it was because he was unable to repay the large sums of money borrowed to repurchase the family estate. That, combined with his recusancy, were sufficient reasons for incarceration. In 1614, the people from whom he had borrowed money petitioned the House of Lords to sell the Tregian lands to repay their loans.

Persons, citing Boyan, mentioned a document that reads: "A warrant was issued by the Lord Lieutenant of Cornwall to inquire about the division of lands of the late Francis Tregian, Recusant, in May 28, 1619" indicating that he died prior to that date. Ironically, living at Fleet Prison allowed Tregian a modicum of style and he maintained a library of "many hundred books" according to Alexander Harris, the prison warden. Probably due to unpaid debts, the library was dispersed and nothing is known about its eventual disposition. After Tregian's death his mother accused him of defrauding her by furtive financial transactions, and another "kynsman," John Arundell, accused him of financial impropriety. Thompson concludes that Tregian's imprisonment was probably much more about improper handling of finances than it was about recusancy.

== How Tregian's name became associated with music ==
=== Historiography ===
There are four manuscript collections that have been associated with Tregian:

- The Fitzwilliam Virginal Book in the Fitzwilliam Museum, the best-known of the anthologies.
- Egerton 3665, a manuscript in the British Library
- Drexel 4302, The Sambrook Book in the Drexel Collection, in the New York Public Library.
- Music MSS 510-14A in Christ Church, Oxford

Intrigued by the supposed connection between these four manuscripts, Ruby Reid Thompson, archivist at the University of Cambridge, undertook a thorough examination of all four manuscripts, physically examining every one of their over 2,200 pages, including a detailed look at three of the manuscripts' watermarks (the custodians of the Fitzwilliam Museum did not permit watermark tracings of the Fitzwilliam Virginal Book). In two articles (which are a preparation for her doctoral dissertation), Thompson provided an extensively researched historiography of how Tregian's name became so closely associated with music and why it persists despite lack of evidence and presentation of new information.

The origins of the association appear to have begun with William Chappell. Writing about the Fitzwilliam Virginal Book in 1855, he mentioned the name Tregian based on six ambiguous abbreviations and only one instance of the name actually spelled out (no. 315, the "Pavana chromatica" has a marginal note to "Mrs Katherin Tregians Pauern" [i.e. Pavane]. Based on this casual association, Chappell does not mention Tregian being a composer or copyist, merely that he was associated with the manuscript.

Musicologist William Barclay Squire elaborated on Chappell's random notes. In 1889 for the article on "Virginal music" written for the first edition of George Grove's Dictionary of Music and Musicians, Squire provided biographies of both elder and younger Tregians and introduced the idea that the younger Tregian might have copied the Fitzwilliam Virginal Book. In 1893, Squire elaborated upon his 1889 biography of the younger Tregian, adding that he had studied "philosophy, music and Latin." Thompson quotes Squire:

If it were not for the dates of the younger Tregian's death and of the composition of Dr. Bull's 'Jewel' [1621], it might be conjectured that the MS was transcribed by the younger Tregian while a prisoner in the Fleet. If this is impossible, there can be but little doubt that it was written by some of his associates, possibly by one of his sisters, who were in England with him.

Thompson then adds her own astute observation:

Squire had apparently become locked into these lines of reasoning as the only explanation for the origin of the manuscript, and he did not consider any other. He was adamant in assigning the compilation of [the Fitzwilliam Virginal Book] to a member of the Tregian family, in spite of the lack of archival corroboration.

Squire continued to elaborate upon his supposed Tregian connection for the 1899 publication of music from the Fitzwilliam Virginal Book. Recognizing that the John Bull piece was not the 1621 work removed the obstacle to hypothesizing that Tregian was the copyist. In the introduction to the edition, Squire wrote "...it may be conjectured with much plausibility that [the Fitzwilliam Virginal Book] was written by the younger Tregian to while away his time in prison." The editors added some scepticism, noting that handwriting samples would be needed to verify Tregian's handwriting. Because of the wide distribution of this 1899 edition of the Fitzwilliam Virginal Book due to reprints, Squire's strongest endorsement of Tregian has gained near-acceptance as fact. In the second (1910) and third (1928) editions of Grove's Dictionary of Music and Musicians, Squire mitigated his view of Tregian's responsibility, retreating from the claim that he had copied the work, but believing that it was still associated with him.

Thompson then examined the seven references mentioned by Chappell, noting that the one unambiguous reference to Mrs. Katherin Tregian could have been either to the younger Tregian's grandmother or aunt. Noting that the reference itself could be a dedication, Thompson noted that a number of works in the Fitzwilliam Virginal Book are dedicated to various people, none known to be connected with the Tregian family. The presence of two instances of the marking "Treg" in titles as well as ambiguous abbreviations—and noting that all these annotations are missing in other manuscript versions of these works—leads Thompson to find a slim basis for Squire's declaration of Tregian being the copyist in 1899, and no surprise that he later retreated from the claim.

In 1951, Bertram Schofield and Thurston Dart's article on the then newly purchased manuscript Egerton 3665 declared that manuscript to be in the same hand as the Fitzwilliam Virginal Book: "The two hands are identical, even down to minute details of erasure, pagination, correction of mistakes and numbering of the content of the books." Noting that two of its pieces had composer attributions abbreviated as "F." and "F.T.", and then adding Drexel 4302 making a group of four manuscripts, Schofield and Dart paradoxically announced their idea of Tregian as copyist was "more probable than ever" while admitting there was "no final proof."

Elizabeth Cole claimed to have found this proof in 1952. Thinking that the attempts to buy back the Tregian family home must be documented, Cole found "no less than twenty-eight signatures" in the "Truro Museum" (the Royal Cornwall Museum). She was particularly taken by two legal documents and showed photographs of them to Schofield who--"perhaps little cautiously" in Thompson's characterisation--"saw no reason to doubt but that Tregian was indeed the scribe of Egerton 3665 and, therefore, the Fitzwilliam Virginal Book." Thompson was able to not only track down the document that had convinced Cole and which she reproduced, but found one that could have been even more convincing. Despite Cole's assertion of similarity of hands, Thompson reproduces fragments of writing from the Fitzwilliam Virginal Book, Egerton 3665 and Christ Church MS. 510–14, and concludes that while the writing shows similarities of style, none of the works can be shown to be in the same hand. She even notes that Dart was not totally convinced as he later stated that Egerton 3665 was "almost certainly in [Tregian's] hand."

In reviewing the biography of Francis Tregian the elder, Thompson notes that his well-documented biography includes only a single link to a musician, the brother of composer William Byrd (this information having been supplied by Benjamin Beard, one of the elder Tregian's informers). Beyond this one link, she is unable to find much more evidence of Tregian's musical engagement, certainly not enough to promote him as "English musician" as did the fifth and sixth editions of Grove's Dictionary of Music and Musicians. Even if the sources for the pieces in the manuscript labelled "F." and "F.T." proved to be that of Tregian, Thompson felt that information would not overturn the question of responsibility for all the manuscripts. At the end of her review of Schofield's and Dart's and Cole's ideas, she concludes: "It seems likely that Cole and Schofield allowed their judgement to be swayed by their own hopes or expectations."

=== Physical evidence ===
Physical examination of the four manuscripts brought Thompson to a new train of thought based on her conclusions.

- Fitzwilliam Virginal Book: Thompson found that the entire manuscript was written on high-quality Swiss paper made by the Düring family of Basel. She concluded that "The manuscript appears to have been planned professionally as a unified project for which enough paper of uniform quality was obtained beforehand."
- The Christ Church manuscript was also made of the same high-quality Düring paper. Thompson concluded: "The regularity of the partbooks indicates that they were planned as a unit and professionally put together, and that they have been carefully handled or stored since compilation."
- Egerton 3665: In this manuscript Thompson finds the same high-quality Düring paper used for 154 folios and 364 folios made by Wendelin Riehl mills in Strasbourg. She notes that the lack of uniformity in the size of the gatherings is evidence that the manuscript was not planned as a whole from the outset. She observes that the gatherings were subject to independent use, and may not have been copied in the order in which they are currently bound.
- Drexel 4302: Of its 257 folios, only five are of the high-quality Düring paper, the remainder being the Wendelin Riehl paper. Showing varied signs of wear like Egerton 3665, Thompson declared Drexel 4302 to be an aggregate volume (composed of smaller gatherings) which had been used independently and brought together when bound.

Paper. Thompson notes that both paper types are rare in England; no other music manuscripts were identified using these paper types. For the paper from the Wendelin Riehl mills, Thompson identified a circa 1598 copy of The Visitation of Lancashire edited by William Smith, Rouge Dragon—a copy directly connected to the royal court. Thompson consulted the Basel paper museum, known as the Basel Paper Mill. According to the Mill, the paper used for the score manuscripts was created during the first quarter of the 17th century. Paper similar to the Wendelin Riehl but with a different watermark was used by architect Inigo Jones for three drawings made between 1619 and 1624, all of them directly related to the royal court. A search of over 30 English archives failed to reveal any more of the Düring paper. With only a few examples of the Wendelin Riehl paper, Thompson concludes that "All the manuscripts containing such papers are found in documents relating to the cultural activities or the official business of the royal courts. Thus a corresponding connection may exist between the four music manuscripts and musical activities of the English court."

Thompson then begins a discussion of physical attributes of the graphic style used in the four manuscripts. She warns against superficial examination by noting that similarity of layout can be deceptive and that one must thoroughly analyze various characteristics such as margins, rulings, scripts, corrections, and annotations. In her 2001 article she focused on ruling and music script. She notes how each of the manuscripts have a relative small ruled area ranging from 55.6% (for the Fitzwilliam Virginal Book) to 58.8% for Egerton 3665), observing that conservation of paper was not an issue and that these scores must have been intended for presentation. She based her observations on the principle that similarly ruled paper would have been created at the same time. She notes this is consistent for the Fitzwilliam Virginal Book and Christ Church MSS 510–14. It is not true for both Egerton 3665 and Drexel 4302, leading her to conclude that these two manuscripts were not planned as single units (which would have had identical ruling) but portions made at different times.

Ruling. Thompson acknowledges the four manuscript share an orderly layout and similar graphic style, creating the appearance of uniformity. Yet she warns that each manuscript page is a "complex object built up from different layers of scribal features applied in a given sequence. Each item (e.g. margins, rulings, scripts, corrections, annotations) when detached from the written web, provides evidence about the genesis of the manuscripts, and throws light on the chronology of scribal activity." She warns against studying only one of these characteristics and drawing conclusions based on information in isolation. Clearly having done the work as part of her dissertation, she chose to focus on staff ruling and music script.

Allowing for reduction of page size due to trimming and binding, Thompson reveals that the average amount of page used in the manuscripts was rather small (55.6% in the Fitzwilliam Virginal Book, 54% in Christ Church manuscript 510–14, 58.8% in Egerton 3665 and 56.6% in Drexel 4302), indicating that saving paper was clearly not a major consideration, whereas attractive presentation was apparently important. She remarks on the "elegant proportions" of the Fitzwilliam Virginal Book and the Christ Church manuscripts 510–514 nothing that they were probably intended as fair or presentation copies.

Noting the complexity of analysing staff ruling, Thompson restricts her comments to general ones. She notes that measurements on each page of all four manuscripts indicate that ruling was done in gatherings, rather than on individual pages. For the Fitzwilliam Virginal Book and the Christ Church manuscripts 510–514, Thompson notes the high degree of consistency in the rulings of both manuscripts "confirms" that they were ruled for a specific project. This is unlike Egerton 3665 and Drexel 4302 which show considerable variations in ruling not only between gatherings but even within them. This leads to Thompson's conclusion that these latter two manuscripts were not planned as unified works where the staves needed to have similar rulings. Some of their gatherings were possibly used individually and trimmed at different times which accounts for the variety in the dimensions of the margins.

Script. Thompson notes that many features of the music script can give the impression of uniformity, suggesting that standards of copying the music text were in place before copying began. But her close inspection of the four manuscripts show distinct scripts. She makes a distinction between "music hand" ("the product of an individual's pen") and "music script" ("the form of notation, a part of who may have written it") and warns that excessive initial focus on the music hand can allow too many subjective decisions for a proper analysis. Thompson identifies two features which can reveal music script variations between different hands: the shape of white notes (that is, half notes) with stems below their noteheads, and the angle and the point of attachment of stems.

There is considerable diversity in the way half notes are made in the four manuscripts. At times they are made by a single unbroken stroke (the notehead followed by the stem) and other times the notehead is drawn first followed by the stem. The downward stems are usually drawn from the right side of the notehead, but occasionally from the center. Their orientation can be straight, bowed or bent at an angle. One would expect consistency in a single scribe, therefore Thompson notes that a mixture of forms indicates at least two scripts. With plates showing the widely different scribal forms in the four manuscripts Thompson notes that they each have different scribal structures. Mus. 510–514 has a uniform script; the Fitzwilliam Virginal Book has mostly a uniform script that gradually switches to a smaller contrasting script several times. Egerton 3665 and Drexel 4302 on the other hand show great scribal diversity. Counting sixty changes of scribal hand for Egerton 3665 and thirty for Drexel 4302, she identifies seventeen specific hands, of which nine are shared by both manuscripts. In summarising her discussion of scribal issues, Thompson acknowledges the difficulties of making determinations of a variety of music scripts, but concludes that there is no question of reducing the multiple hands to a single person.

Conclusion. Thompson's conclusion is direct:

The attribution of these manuscripts to Francis Tregian's hand is thus little more than an attractive legend. Never based on very solid biographical evidence, it is contradicted by the physical characteristics of the manuscripts themselves. Their paper strongly suggests that the manuscripts were prepared by a group of professional scribes working for patrons at court or connected to court circles. But a scriptorium capable of executing these commissions could scarcely have been brought into being expressly for that purpose. It is likely to have dealt with other, not necessarily musical, tasks, although no further manuscripts prepared by the same group have yet been identified.

David J. Smith's response to Thompson's 2001 article clearly takes the traditional view of Tregian's role by repeatedly referring to the group of four manuscripts as "The Tregian manuscripts." He reproduces two documents with Francis Tregian's name (one of them being HC 2/27, the same one that Thompson and Cole had reproduced) from the Royal Cornwall Museum. Smith states that cultivated gentlemen developed more than one script. Recognizing the differences between signature and the body of the document as well as scribal inconsistencies within the same document, he states "...there is no reason to discard the hypothesis on ground of handwriting alone" and several lines later: "These differences, found within a document written by the same scribe at the same time, point to the pitfalls lying in the way of those who try to prove (or disprove) hypotheses by means of handwriting alone." (This is a false premise since Thompson used handwriting as only one of many elements to her analysis.) Where Thompson argued that the change in music script suggests more than one scribe, Smith uses exactly the same argument to argue in favour of a single scribe, since an individual's handwriting changes over time. He states "The Tregian manuscripts were probably compiled over many years, so inconsistencies in their notation are only to be expected", deliberately ignoring Thompson's findings concerning the paper particularly of the uniformity of the Fitzwilliam Virginal Book and Mus. 510-514A. Smith notes that both the Fitzwilliam Virginal Book and Drexel 4302 have empty ruled staves at their ends which he sees as evidence of a "work in progress." Referring to Thompson's conclusion, Smith states "It seems hardly credible that a scriptorium of professional scribes would have presented incomplete manuscripts to whomever commissioned them", ignoring Thompson's later comment "...the chequered history of [these manuscripts'] compilation may result from changes in the patron's requirements or even a change of patron."

Regarding the paper gatherings from which Thompson was able to determine different origins for the Fitzwilliam Virginal Book and Mus. 510-514A as compared to Egerton 3665 and Drexel 4302, Smith states "The way in which individual gatherings have been combined to form a larger work suggests that, initially, the genesis of these sources was a far more haphazard affair: they seem more the work of a committed individual pursuing a passion, collecting together materials from sources which came his way, than the product of a grand design." When later he does mention the paper types revealed by Thompson he again resorts to scribal issues.

Smith goes on at length to discuss particular points of the music content, an aspect that Thompson deliberately did not discuss, since she recognised that physical analysis must precede content analysis Without supplying corroborative physical evidence aside from scribal issues that do not directly address or refute Thompson's discoveries, Smith feels that "there is no reason to discard the hypothesis that Tregian was the scribe."

Whether there is still a controversy concerning Tregian, in his European Music: 1520—1640 (first published in 2006), James Haar considers the hypothesis to be "demolished" by Thompson's findings.

== CD ==
- Byrd, William: Pieces from "The Fitzwilliam Virginal Book" / Ursula Duetschler [Cembalo]. - Thun : Claves Records, 1990. - 1 CD (70 Min.) : Stereo, DDD

== See also ==
- Francis Tregian the Elder
- Recusancy

== Works consulted ==
- Cole, Elizabeth (January 1952), "In Search of Francis Tregian", Music & Letters, 33: 28–32, doi:10.1093/ml/xxxiii.1.28
- Haar, James, ed. (2014), European Music: 1520–1640, Suffolk, UK: Boydell & Brewer, ISBN 9781843838944
- Persons, Jerry C. (1969). The Sambrooke Book: Drexel 4302 (M.M. thesis). Wichita State University. OCLC 18307425.
- Schofield, Bertram; Dart, Thurston (1951), "Tregian's Anthology", Music & Letters, 32 (3): 205–16, doi:10.1093/ml/xxxii.3.205
- Smith, David J. (2002), "A legend? Francis Tregian the Younger as music copyist", Musical Times, 143 (1879): 7–16, doi:10.2307/1004593, JSTOR 1004593 (JSTOR access by subscription)
- Thompson, Ruby Reid (1992), "The 'Tregian' Manuscripts: A Study of Their Compilation", British Library Journal, 18 (2): 202–204, JSTOR 42554349 (JSTOR access by subscription)
- Thompson, Ruby Reid (2001), "Francis Tregian the Younger as Music Copyist: A Legend and an Alternative View", Music and Letters, 82 (1): 1–31, doi:10.1093/ml/82.1.1, JSTOR 3526454 (JSTOR access by subscription)
