= Peter Philips =

English composer

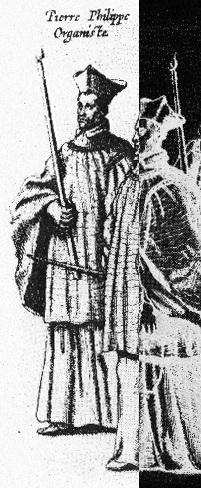
- Born: 1560; Devonshire or London, Kingdom of England
- Died: 1628 (aged 67–68); Brussels, Spanish Netherlands
- Occupations: Organist, virginals teacher, Roman Catholic priest
- Era: Baroque Music

Peter Philips (also Phillipps, Phillips, Pierre Philippe, Pietro Philippi, Petrus Philippus; c.1560–1628) was an eminent English composer, organist, and Catholic priest exiled to Flanders in the Spanish Netherlands. He was one of the greatest keyboard virtuosos of his time, and transcribed or arranged several Italian motets and madrigals by such composers as Lassus, Palestrina, and Giulio Caccini for his instruments. Some of his keyboard works are found in the Fitzwilliam Virginal Book. Philips also wrote many sacred choral works.

== Life ==
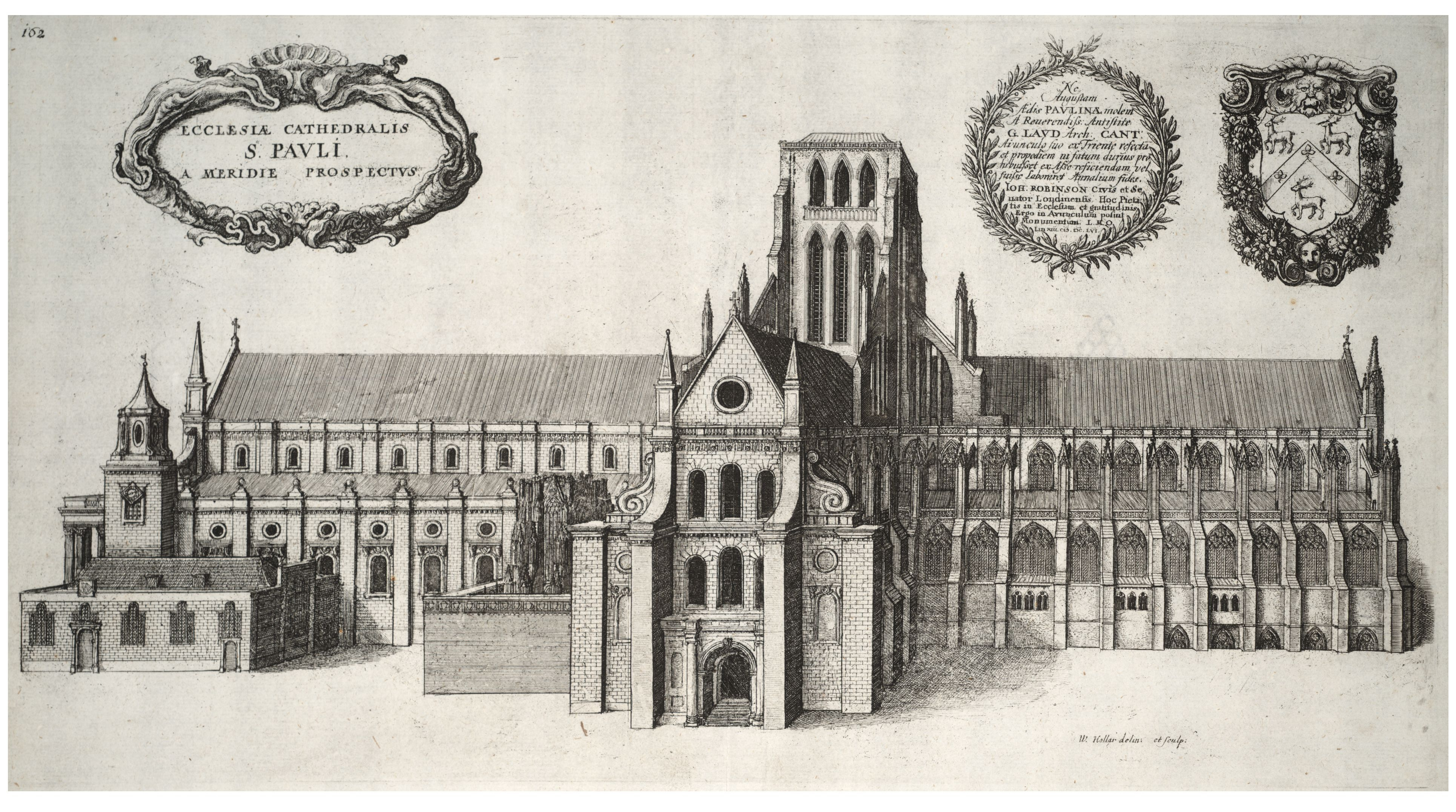
Philips began his musical career at Old St Paul's Cathedral in London

Philips was born in 1560 or 1561, possibly in Devonshire or London. From 1572 to 1578 he began his career as a boy chorister at Old St Paul's Cathedral in London, under the aegis of the Catholic master of choristers, Sebastian Westcott (died 1582), who had also trained the young William Byrd some twenty years earlier. Philips must have had a close relationship with his master, as he lodged in his house up to the time of Westcote's death, and was a beneficiary of his will.

In the same year (1582), Philips left England for good, like so many others for reasons of his Catholicism, and stayed briefly in Flanders before traveling to Rome where he entered the service of Alessandro Farnese (1520–1589), with whom he stayed for three years, and was also engaged as organist at the English College in Rome. It was here that in February 1585 he met a fellow Catholic exile, Thomas, third Baron Paget (c. 1544–1590). Philips entered Paget's service as a musician, and the two left Rome in March 1585, traveling over several years to Genoa, Madrid, Paris, Brussels, and finally Antwerp, where Philips settled in 1590 and where Paget died the same year.

After settling, Philips married and gained a precarious living by teaching the virginals to children. In 1593 he went to Amsterdam "to sie and heare an excellent man of his faculties", doubtless Jan Pieterszoon Sweelinck, whose reputation had by then long been made. On his way back, Philips was denounced by a compatriot for complicity in a plot on Queen Elizabeth's life, and he was temporarily imprisoned at the Hague, where he probably composed the pavan and galliard Doloroso (Fitzwilliam Virginal Book nos. LXXX and LXXXI). Philips himself translated the accusations made against him during his trial, showing that he could speak Dutch. He was acquitted and released without further charges.

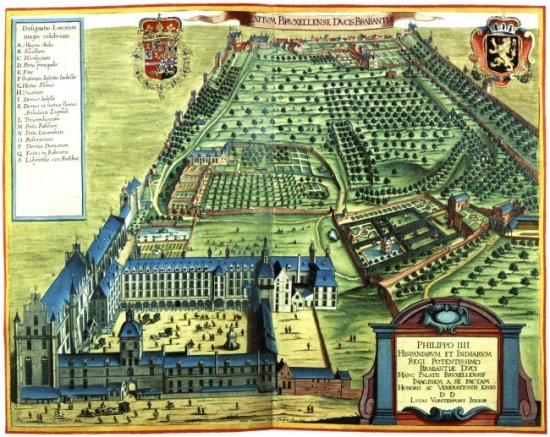
In 1597 Philips was appointed organist to the chapel of Albert VII, Archduke of Austria at the Coudenberg Palace in Brussels

Philips' fortunes took a turn for the better on his return, and in 1597 he was employed in Brussels as organist to the chapel of Albert VII, Archduke of Austria who had been appointed governor of the Spanish Netherlands in 1595. Here, after the death of his wife and his child, he was ordained a priest in either 1601 or 1609; in any case, he received a canonry at Soignies in 1610, and another at Béthune in 1622 or 1623. His position at court allowed Philips to meet the leading composers of the time, including Girolamo Frescobaldi, who visited the Low Countries in 1607–1608, and his fellow-countryman John Bull, who had fled England on a charge of adultery. His nearest colleague, however, was Peeter Cornet (c. 1575–1633), organist to Archduchess Isabella, wife of Philips' employer, the archduke.

Philips died in 1628, probably in Brussels, where he was buried.

== Works ==
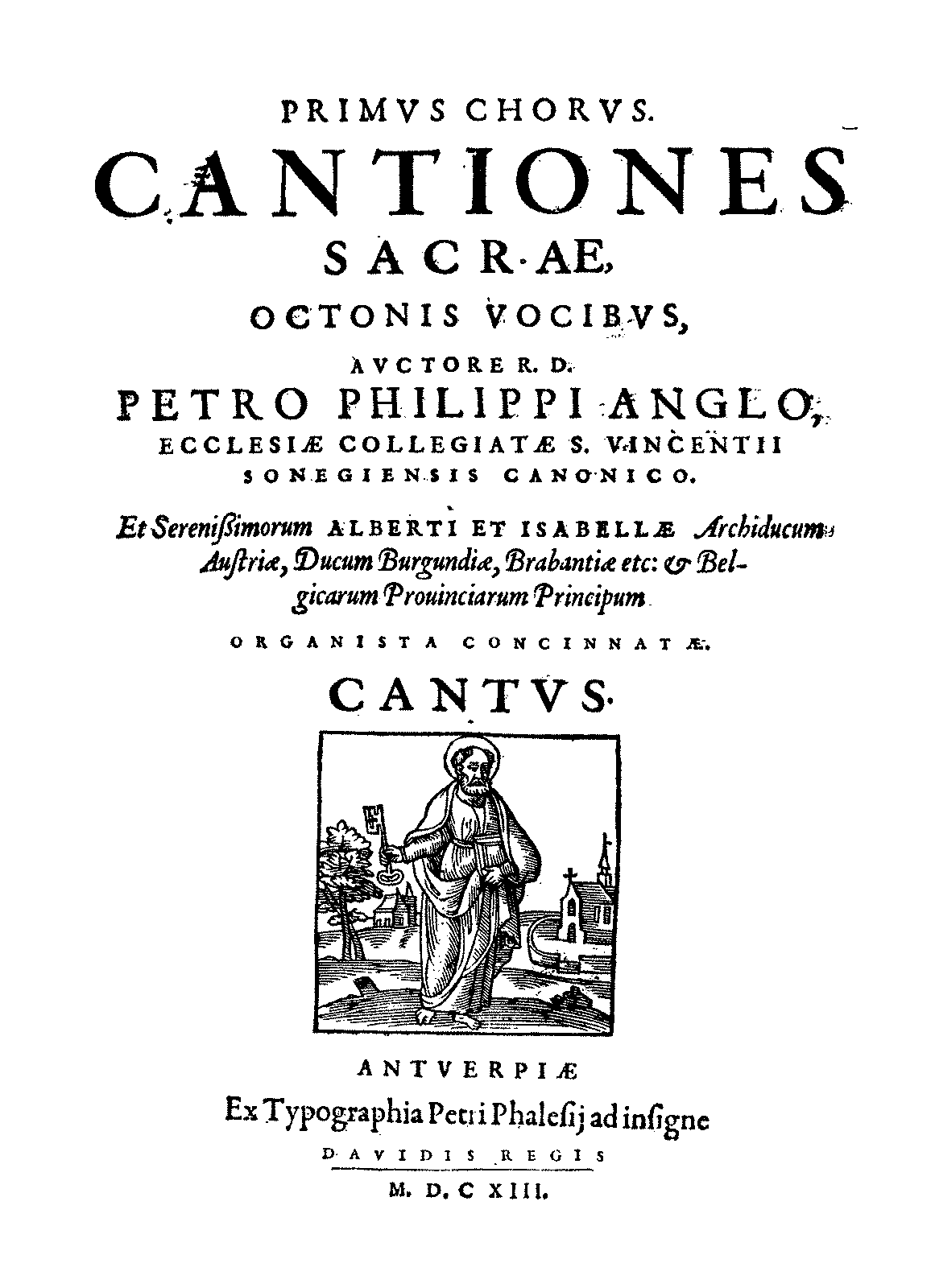
The score of Philips' Cantiones Sacrae (1613)

Philips was an extremely prolific composer: his surviving motets number in the hundreds, and he also composed both instrumental and consort music. His keyboard pieces are mostly in the tradition of the English virginalist school, but his choral works, although retaining occasional English characteristics, are largely in the style of more conservative Italian contemporary composers such as Giovanni Croce.

- Works in the Fitzwilliam Virginal Book:

The earliest surviving piece we know to be by Philips is a pavan dated 1580 in the Fitzwilliam Virginal Book (no. LXXXV). It bears the note: The first one Phi[lips] made. It was the subject of a magnificent set of variations by Jan Pieterszoon Sweelinck entitled Pavana Philippi, a version by Thomas Morley, and survives in arrangements for consort and lute. Of Philip's 27 known keyboard pieces (excluding doubtful works) – pavans, galliards, fantasias and settings of Italian masters – no fewer than nineteen are included in the same collection. The probable compiler of the Fitzwilliam Virginal Book, Francis Tregian the Younger, a fellow Catholic, was almost certainly acquainted with Philips: both men were at the court of Brussels in 1603, and Tregian may well have been responsible for importing Philips' works to England. The pavan Doloroso (no. LXXX) appears to be dedicated to Tregian, bearing the title Pauana Doloroso. Treg[ian], and there is also a Pavana Pagget with its galliard, dated 1590 and no doubt written on the death of his patron, Lord Thomas Paget. Many of the pieces are settings of Italian composers, and in some Philips' name is spelled the Flemish way: Peeter suggesting that the scribe – possibly Tregian himself – was copying from continental manuscripts.

- Other works:

1591: Philips' publisher in Antwerp, Pierre Phalèse the Younger (1550–1629), printed his collection of madrigals entitled Melodia Olympica, followed by further editions in 1594 and 1611.
1596: Philips published his Primo Libro de Madrigali a sei voci, a book of madrigals for six voices.
1598: A further book of madrigals for eight voices published.
1603: Another set of madrigals for six voices published.
1612: The first set of Cantiones Sacrae for five voices printed by Phalèse.
1613: A second set of Cantiones Sacrae Octonis Vocibus for double chorus of eight voices.
1613: Gemmulae Sacrae Binis et Ternis Vocibus cum Basso Continuo Organum.
1615: 3 Trios (without instrumentation) in L'Institution Harmonique by Salomon De Caus, Frankfurt
1616: Les Rossignols spirituels, two and four-part arrangements of popular songs adapted to sacred texts in Latin and French.
1616: Deliciae sacrae binis et ternis vocibus cum basso continuo organum.
1623: Litanies to Loreto.
1628: Paradisus sacris cantionibus consitus, una, duabus et tribus vocibus decantantis.

== Collections and scores ==
- The Fitzwilliam Virginal Book, J.A. Fuller Maitland and W. Barclay Squire, Dover Publications, New York 1963. SBN 486-21068-5.
- Eight Keyboard Pieces by Peter Philips: A collection of all Philips' known music for keyboard instruments contained in sources other than the Fitzwilliam Virginal Book. John Harley (ed.). Stainer & Bell, London 1995.
- Complete Keyboard Music. David J Smith (ed.). Stainer & Bell, London 1999.
- Cantiones Sacrae Octonis Vocibus (1613). Musica Britannica vol. 61. John Steele (ed.). Stainer & Bell, London 1992.
- Select Italian Madrigals. Musica Britannica vol. 29. John Steele (ed.). Stainer & Bell, London 1985.
- "75 Motets for Two Solo Voices and Organ Continuo from Paradisus Sacris Cantionibus", Janet E. Hunt (ed.), www.huntmusic.us, 2015. ISBN 978-0-9962221-0-5.
- "17 Motets for Three Solo Voices and Organ Continuo from Paradisus Sacris Cantionibus", Janet E. Hunt (ed.), www. huntmusic.us, 2016. ISBN 978-0-9962221-2-9.
- Gemmulae Sacrae (1613). Janet E. Hunt (ed.), www.huntmusic.us, 2023.

Philips' SSATB motet "Ascendit Deus" from Cantiones Sacrae (1612) appears in:

- Le Huray, Peter, ed. (1982). The Treasury of English Church Music 1545–1650. Cambridge: Cambridge university press. ISBN 0521284058.
- Morris, Christopher, ed. (1978). The Oxford Book of Tudor Anthems. Oxford University Press, Music Dept. ISBN 0193533251.

== Discography ==
- Paradisus Sacris Cantionibus. Currende Vocal Ensemble. Accent ACC 8862
- Consort Music. The Parley of Instruments. Hyperion CDA 66240
- Keyboard Music. Paul Nicholson. Hyperion CDA 66734
- Harpsichord Music. Emer Buckley. Harmonia Mundi HMC 901263
- The English Exile. Colin Booth. Soundboard. SBCD 992
- Cantiones Sacrae Quinis Vocibus. The Sarum Consort, Andrew Mackay. Gaudeamus GAU 217
- Cantiones Sacrae Quinis Vocibus. The Tudor Consort, Peter Walls. Naxos 8.555056
- Cantiones Sacrae Quinis et Octonibus Vocibus. The Sarum Consort, Andrew Mackay. Naxos 8.572832
- Complete Keyboard Works Vol 1. Siegbert Rampe. MDG 341 1257-2
- Complete Keyboard Works Vol 2. Siegbert Rampe. MDG 341 1435-2
- Motets et Madrigaux. Cappella Mediterranea, Leonardo García Alarcón. AMBRONAY AMY015
- Cantiones Sacrae, 1612. Choir of Trinity College Cambridge, Richard Marlow. CHANDOS CHAN 0770
