= Bernardo Storace =

17th-century Italian composer

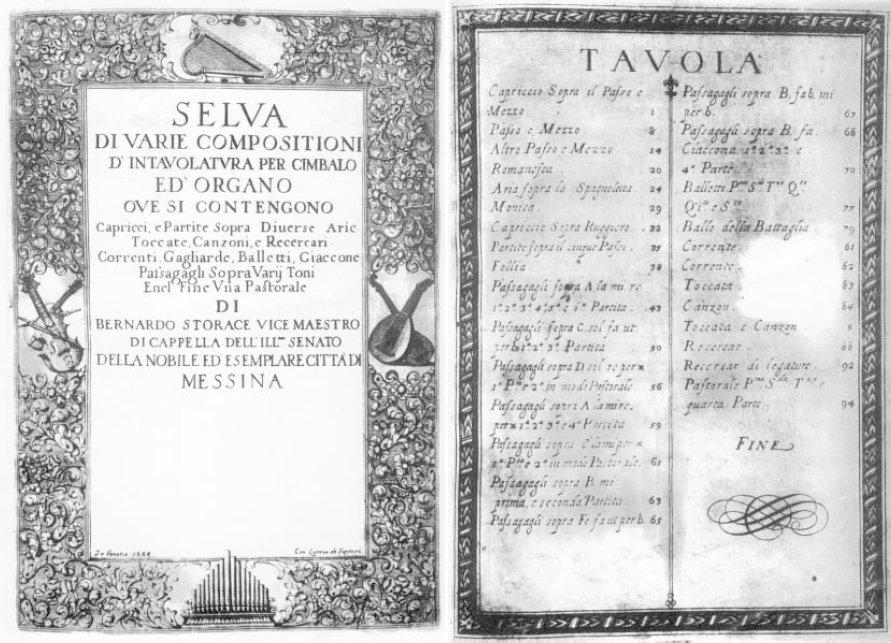
Title page and table of contents from Selva di varie compositioni

Bernardo Storace (fl. 1664) was an Italian composer. Almost nothing is known about his life; his only surviving collection of music contains numerous variation sets and represents a transitory stage between the time of Girolamo Frescobaldi and that of Bernardo Pasquini.

== Life ==
Very little is known about his life, except that in 1664 he served as Vice-Maestro di cappella to the senate of Messina. This fact is mentioned on the title page of Selva di varie compositioni d'intavolatura per cimbalo ed organo, the single surviving collection of Storace's music, which is also the only source of information on the composer. Messina was twice devastated by earthquakes, in 1783 and in 1908, so archival research is impossible. Given that Selva di varie compositioni was published in Venice and the music is stylistically somewhat more related to that of northern Italian composers, it is possible that Storace was originally from the north of Italy.

== Works ==
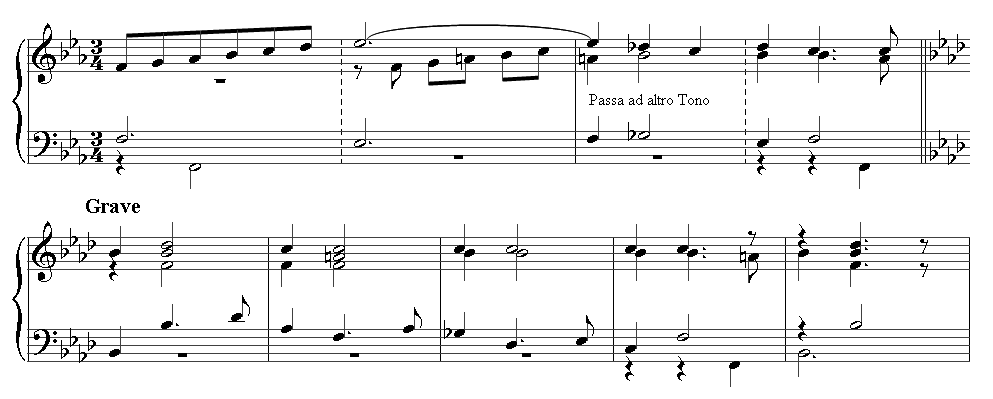
One of the tonal transitions from "Passagagli sopra Fe fa ut per ♭". The composer's note reads: "Passing to another tone."

Storace's main interest in Selva di varie compositioni is the variation form. Particularly notable are the four passacaglias, which contain, in total, 320 representations of the descending tetrachord. Two of these works are split into several sections connected by modulatory passages: "Passagagli sopra D sol re per ♯" contains four sections (D major, A major, E major, and B minor; a total of 91 variations) and "Passagagli sopra Fe fa ut per ♭" three (F minor, B-flat minor and E-flat major; a total of 72 variations). The single chaconne included in the collection also comprises variations on a four-bar pattern.

The rest of the variation sets tend to feature longer patterns, up to 24 bars in "Aria sopra la Spagnoletta". The theme of the latter piece is, curiously, not related to Frescobaldi's Spagnoletta; it is only found in a 16th-century Florentine manuscript. Storace uses a transposed version of it and produces six variations with very brief connecting passages between them. A similar situation is observed in "Partita sopra il Cinque passi": there are fifteen variations on a six-bar theme, connected by brief transitions, and the theme is again not related to the more well-known "Cinquepassi" of The Mulliner Book, or to cinquepassi as explained by Michael Praetorius in his writings. Storace's "Follia" uses the same theme as Frescobaldi's "Follia", but neither is related to the famous "La Folía". Finally, Storace's variations on the "Passo e mezzo" include one on the moderno variant of the theme and two on the antico; all three sets are examples of mixed variations, for they include sections marked gagliarda or corrente, i.e., dances.

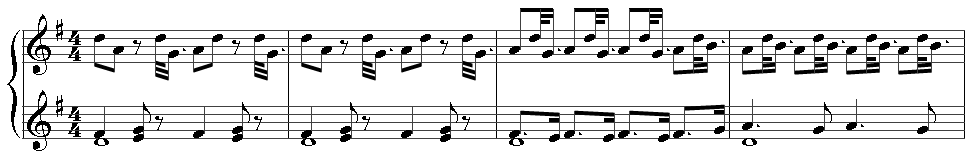
Sample of figurations from Pastorale

Storace's two toccatas are rather brief pieces, less complex harmonically than their Italian predecessors. The two ricercars, on the other hand, are masterful works–the first (titled simply "Ricercar") is in fact a triple fugue, the first theme of which is Frescobaldi's, from the famous "Ricercare con l'obbligo di cantare la quinta parte senza tocarla" from Fiori musicali. The last piece of Selva di varie compositioni is also its most intriguing: Storace's Pastorale is a very long work consisting of numerous repeated figures, variations, etc., all over an incessant pedal note. There are five sections arranged symmetrically: prima parte and seconda parte are followed by an aria, which is followed by terza parte and quarta parte.

== List of works ==
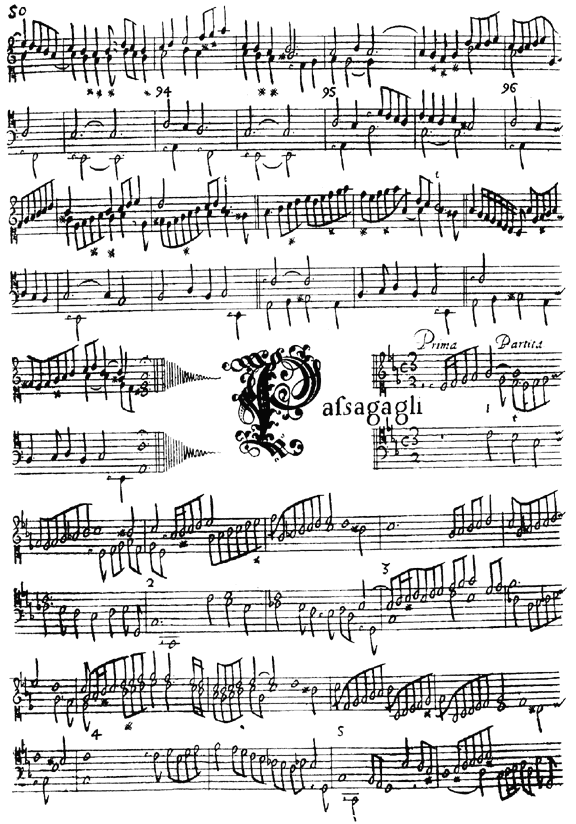
Facsimile of a page from Selva di varie compositioni, showing the end of "Passagagli sopra A la mi re" and the beginning of "Passagagli sopra C sol fa ut"

Selva di varie compositioni contains the following works (listed here in the original order):

- Three sets of variations on the Passo e mezzo:
  - Capriccio sopra il Passo e Mezzo
  - Passo e Mezzo
  - Altro Passo e Mezzo
- Variations on the Romanesca
- Variations on the Spagnoletta (Aria sopra la Spagnoletta)
- Variations on the Monica
- Variations on the Ruggiero (Capriccio sopra Ruggiero)
- Variations on the Cinque passi (Partita sopra il Cinque passi)
- Variations on the Folia (Follia)
- Four passacaglias:
  - Passagagli sopra A la mi re
  - Passagagli sopra C sol fa ut
  - Passagagli sopra D sol re per ♯
  - Passagagli sopra Fe fa ut per ♭
- Chaconne (Ciaccona)
- Variations on the Balletto
- Ballo della Battaglia
- Two correntes
- Two Toccata e canzon pairs
- Two ricercars:
  - Ricercar
  - Ricercar di legature
- Pastorale
