= Giovanni Valentini =

Italian composer (1582–1649)

- Born: c. 1582
- Died: 30 April 1649 Vienna, Austria
- Genres: Baroque
- Occupations: Composer; poet; Kapellmeister
- Instruments: Keyboard, Organ
- Years active: c. 1604–1649

Giovanni Valentini (ca. 1582 – 29/30 April 1649) was an Italian Baroque composer, poet and keyboard virtuoso. Overshadowed by his contemporaries, Claudio Monteverdi and Heinrich Schütz, Valentini is practically forgotten today, although he occupied one of the most prestigious musical posts of his time. He is best remembered for his innovative usage of asymmetric meters and the fact that he was Johann Kaspar Kerll's first teacher.

== Life ==
Little is known about Valentini's life. He was born around 1582/3, probably in Venice, and almost certainly studied music under Giovanni Gabrieli there. Although the typical graduation Opus 1 of madrigals to be expected from a Gabrieli pupil – such as Opus 1 of Mogens Pedersøn (1608), Johann Grabbe (1609) and Heinrich Schütz (1611) – is not extant, Antimo Liberati (1617–1692) who worked in Venice in the 1640s records him in a letter of the 1680s as "Giovanni Valentini Veneziano, della famosa Schola de' Gabrielli."

In approximately 1604/5 Valentini was appointed as organist of the Polish court chapel under Sigismund III Vasa; his first published works are dated 1609 and 1611, when he was still in Poland. In 1614 Valentini was employed by Ferdinand II (who was then the Archduke of Styria) and moved to Graz. The Graz court's music chapel used enharmonic instruments extensively, which was of considerable importance for the development of Valentini's style; a contemporary account of 1617 praises him as a virtuoso performer on the enharmonic clavicymbalum universale, seu perfectum, which had a keyboard of 77 keys spanning four octaves.

In 1619 Ferdinand was elected the Holy Roman Emperor and moved to Vienna with the court and the musicians of the Graz chapel. Valentini served as imperial court organist in Vienna for several years, then became court Kapellmeister in 1626, succeeding Giovanni Priuli, and accepted the post of choral director at the Michaelerkirche in Vienna in 1627/8. Valentini seems to have had an exceptional reputation and was favoured by both Ferdinand II and Ferdinand III (whom he tutored in music), as evidenced by several large monetary gifts from the former and financial support for Valentini's widow from the latter. In this respect, Valentini is similar to Johann Jakob Froberger, who also was a close personal friend of Ferdinand III. Valentini also seems to have been effective as Kapellmeister, managing to significantly increase the salaries for the court chapel musicians.

For unknown reasons, Valentini effectively stopped publishing his music after 1626 (all of his poetry, however, was published after that year). He was involved in the production of the earliest Viennese operas and famously taught the young Johann Kaspar Kerll music, probably in the 1640s. Valentini held the position at the Michaelerkirche until at least 1631, but remained court Kapellmeister until his death in 1649. He was succeeded by Antonio Bertali. In his will, he bequeathed his works to Ferdinand.

== Works ==
Valentini's oeuvre consists for the most part of different kinds of vocal music: madrigals, masses, motets and sacred concertos. Because he was apparently not interested in writing oratorios or operas, Valentini is sometimes regarded as a conservative composer, especially when compared to Monteverdi. This is, however, somewhat erroneous, as numerous works exhibit considerable innovations and elaborate experimentation. The 1621 collection Musiche a doi voci is probably the most famous example: it not only contains some of the earliest examples of the dramatic dialogue, but also features entire passages in 5/4 time (Con guardo altero) and consecutive bars of 9/8 and 7/8 (Vanne, o cara amorosa).

Of the large-scale sacred pieces, the Messa, Magnificat et Jubilate Deo of 1621 contains three works scored for seven choirs (which is more parts than any music published before) and is an early example of printed trumpet parts. The rest of Valentini's masses exhibit features common to other composers' works in the genre; they include some conservative concertato settings and polychoral parody masses. Small-scale works such as motets and psalm settings are more interesting musically. Most are written using a modern concertato style, with virtuosic instrumental writing and, in some pieces, extensive use of chromaticisms. The motet In te Domine speravi was one of the last ever compositions with a part written specifically for viola bastarda, a type of a tenor viol. The sacred concertos from the 1625 Sacri concerti collection are among the first sacred works written north of the Alps to employ stile recitativo extensively.

The Secondo libro di madrigali (1616) is (along with the 1621 Musiche a doi voci) among the most important of Valentini's secular works as it is the first published collection of madrigals which combined voices and instruments. The instrumental arrangement plays diverse roles in different pieces, from mere embellishments to full integration into the polyphonic texture of the piece. The latter approach is also used heavily in Musiche concertate (1619). The duet and dialogue pattern writing seen in Musiche a doi voci is reminiscent of the duets from Monteverdi's Settimo libro de madrigali, published in 1619.

Other works include keyboard canzonas in five or six voices (perhaps more adventurous harmonically than Froberger's four voice canzonas and capriccios, but contrapuntally less complex; a rarity for their time because of the number of voices) and instrumental pieces (sonatas, canzonas) that feature harmonic experiments in the vein of Valentini's motets. The 1621 chamber music collection, Musica di camera, includes pieces built on ostinato patterns such as the passamezzo, romanesca and ruggiero.

== List of published works ==
- Canzoni, libro primo, Venice, 1609
- Motecta, Venice, 1611
- Secondo libro de madrigali, Venice, 1616
- Missae concertatae, Venice, 1617
- Salmi, hinni, Magnificat, antifone, falsibordone et motetti, Venice, 1618
- Musiche concertate – con voci, & istromenti a 6, 7, 8, 9, 10, con basso continuo., Venice, 1619
- Musica di camera, libro quarto, Venice, 1621
- Missae quatuor, Venice, 1621
- Messa, Magnificat et Jubilate Deo, Vienna, 1621
- Musiche a doi voci, Venice, 1621
- Il quinto libro de madrigali, Venice, 1625
- Sacri concerti, Venice, 1625

Additionally, 3 masses, 3 litanies, several sonatas, numerous sacred works and pieces for keyboard survive in manuscript. Evidence of a considerable amount of lost works exists.

== Recordings ==
- O Dulcis Amor Jesu (1999). La Capella Ducale, Musica Fiata, conducted by Roland Wilson; Sony Classical SMK 87855 (vocal music by Valentini and Giovanni Priuli)
- Giovanni Valentini – Motetti e Madrigali a due Soprani (2001). Ilaria Geroldi, Marina Morelli (sopranos), Ensemble La Moderna Prattica conducted by Stefano Molardi; Christophorus 77238 (motets and madrigals for two sopranos)
- Johann Capsar Kerll – Scaramuza (2004). Leon Berben (organ); AEOLUS AE-10441 (organ works by Kerll and 6 canzonas by Valentini)
- Oddities and Trifles: The Very Peculiar Instrumental Music of Giovanni Valentini (2015). ACRONYM; Olde Focus Recordings FCR904 (17 canzonas and sonatas)
- Giovanni Valentini: Secondo libro de madrigali (2016) ACRONYM & Les Canards Chantants; Olde Focus Recordings FCR908 (18 concerted madrigals)
