= Michael Schaefer =

Michael Schäffer, Schaefer, Schafer, or Shafer may refer to:

- Michael P. Schaefer (1946–2013), member of the Pennsylvania State Senate from 1977 to 1980
- Michael Schaefer (producer), German film producer
- Mike Schaefer (born 1938), American politician
- Michael Schäfer (born 1959), Danish footballer and manager
- Mike Schafer (fl. 1980s–2020s), Canadian-American ice hockey coach
- Mike Schafer (author) (born 1949), American author
- Michael Schäffer (curler) (born 1968), German curler
- Michael Schaffer (journalist), American journalist
- Michael Schäffer (lutenist) (1937–1978), German lutenist
- Michael Shafer (born 1972), American basketball coach
- Michael Shaeffer (born 1975), English actor

== See also ==
- Michael Schaeffer House, a historic home in Evansville, Indiana
- Michaelshaffera, a genus of snout moths
