= Automobile folklore =

The major effects of the automobile on societies include the development of diverse customs and traditions.

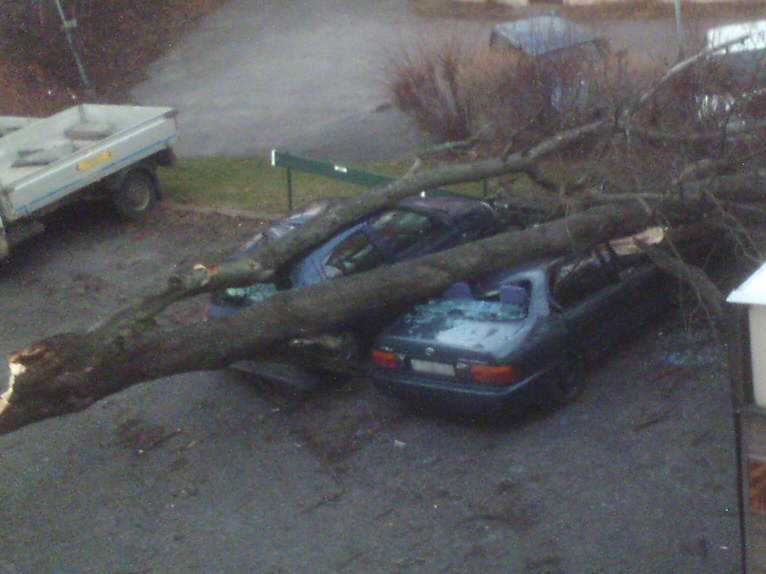
Car accident omen

Some drivers believe that a new car is in greater danger than a used car of getting into an accident or having a collision. They believe the new, undamaged condition of the car is "tempting fate". Some drivers will use a coin to scratch the car, based on the (false) belief that since the car is new and nothing has happened to it yet, the chances of something bad happening to the car are greater when compared to a used car with its fair share of dents and scratches. In the hopes of preventing a highly-damaging accident, they will place a small nick or scratch on the car in an area where it will not be seen. The inside of the wheel well is one commonly scratched area.

There are also a few practices associated with graduations. In the days leading up to a graduation, some drivers (and in some cases friends of the driver) will write on the car windows with washable paint. The messages usually congratulate the driver of the car and list the driver's school and year of graduation. After graduating from high school or college, some drivers choose to hang their tassel from the rearview mirror.

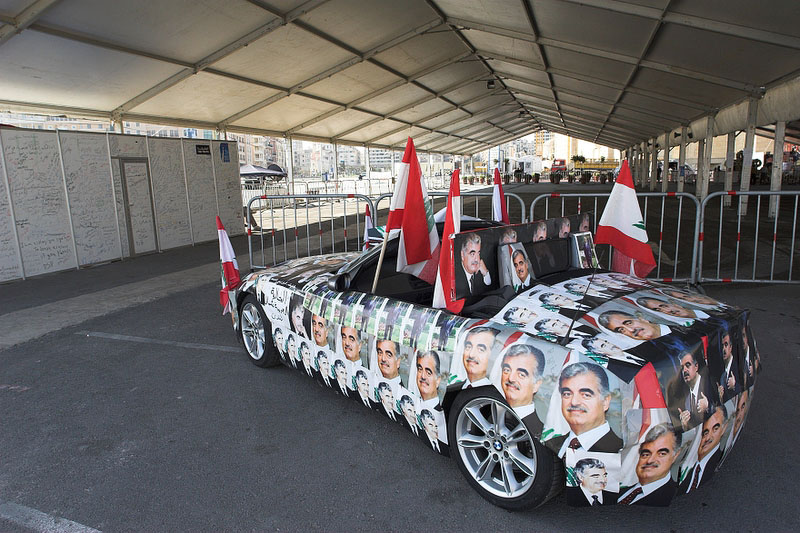
Mourning Car decked with flags

== Religious ==
There are also religious acts that are associated with automobiles. This can include getting the car blessed by a cleric or placing an object of religious significance inside the car.

A predominantly Roman Catholic practice is to place a medal of Saint Christopher, the patron saint of truck drivers and travelers in general, inside the car. Usually, the driver will have this medal blessed by a priest. An ancient legend, mentioned by Erasmus in the Praise of Folly, holds that those who see an image of Saint Christopher cannot die through misadventure during that day. Not surprisingly, images of Saint Christopher became popular automobile accessories. Through the presence of the medal, the driver is asking the saint to pray on his or her behalf for a safe and uneventful journey.

A somewhat more sombre purpose originally stood behind the familiar plastic Jesus that some Christians have mounted on their dashboards. The original plastic Jesus was circulated by the Sacred Heart Auto League, founded in 1955 by Father Gregory Bezy, SCJ. This devotional society placed the traditional Roman Catholic figure of Jesus displaying his Sacred Heart on the dashboard. Father Bezy was moved to do this as a "practical answer to what he considered the ever-increasing dangers of our overcrowded streets and highways." In other words, in the event of a fatal accident, Father Bezy hoped that the last thing the riders would see would be the image of Jesus, and as such face Eternity with faith and contrition.

The plastic dashboard Jesus proved popular among non-Catholic Christians as well. The figure is well known enough to have inspired a folk song "Plastic Jesus", originally attributed to Ed Rush and George Cromarty, which has acquired many anonymous folk variants. One frequent set of verses has it open:

I don't care if it rains or freezes
Long as I got my Plastic Jesus
Riding on the dashboard of my car.
Through my trials and tribulations
And my travels through the nations
With my Plastic Jesus I'll go far.

Some Catholics will also hang rosary beads from their rearview mirrors.

Catholics and other Christians may also hang crosses or crucifixes from the rearview mirror.

== Cars for special occasions ==
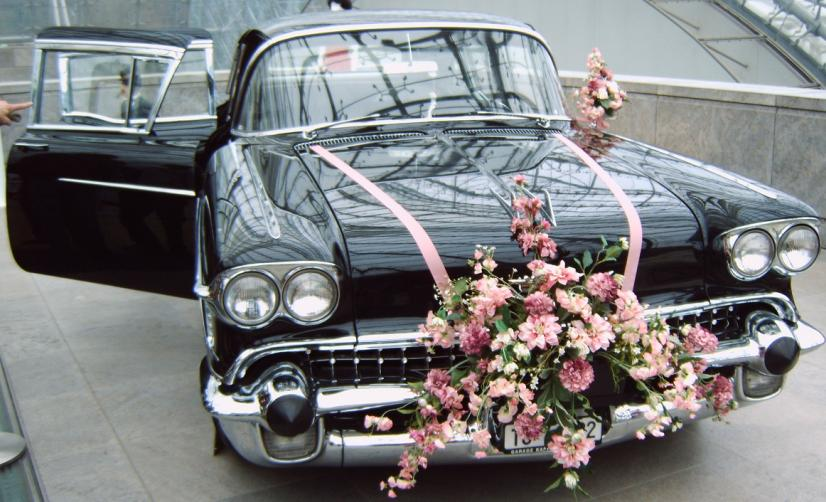
Wedding transport

Cars are often decorated, and have wishes written on them, and various streamers or trailing objects attached, in celebrations of weddings and graduations.

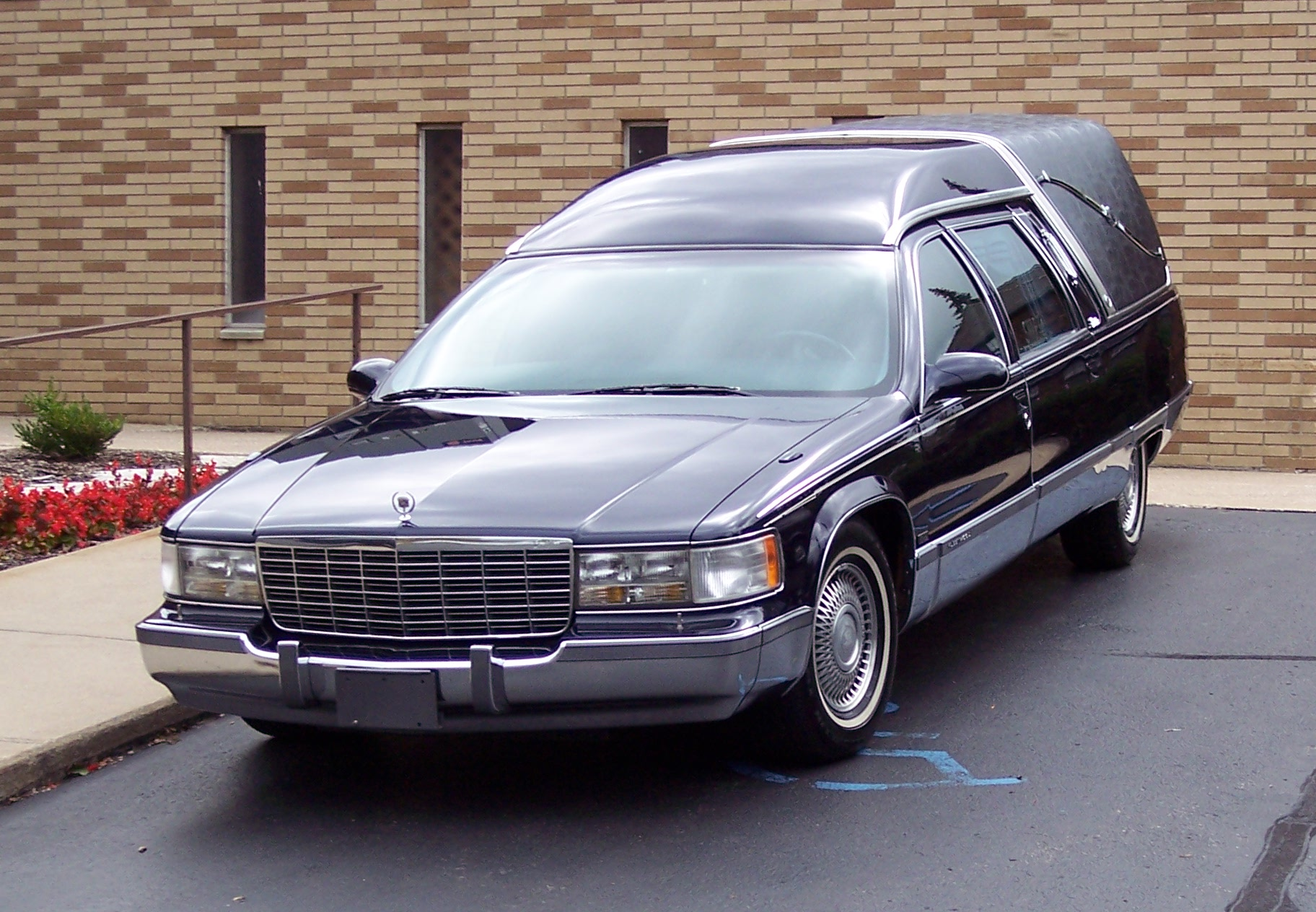
Hearse

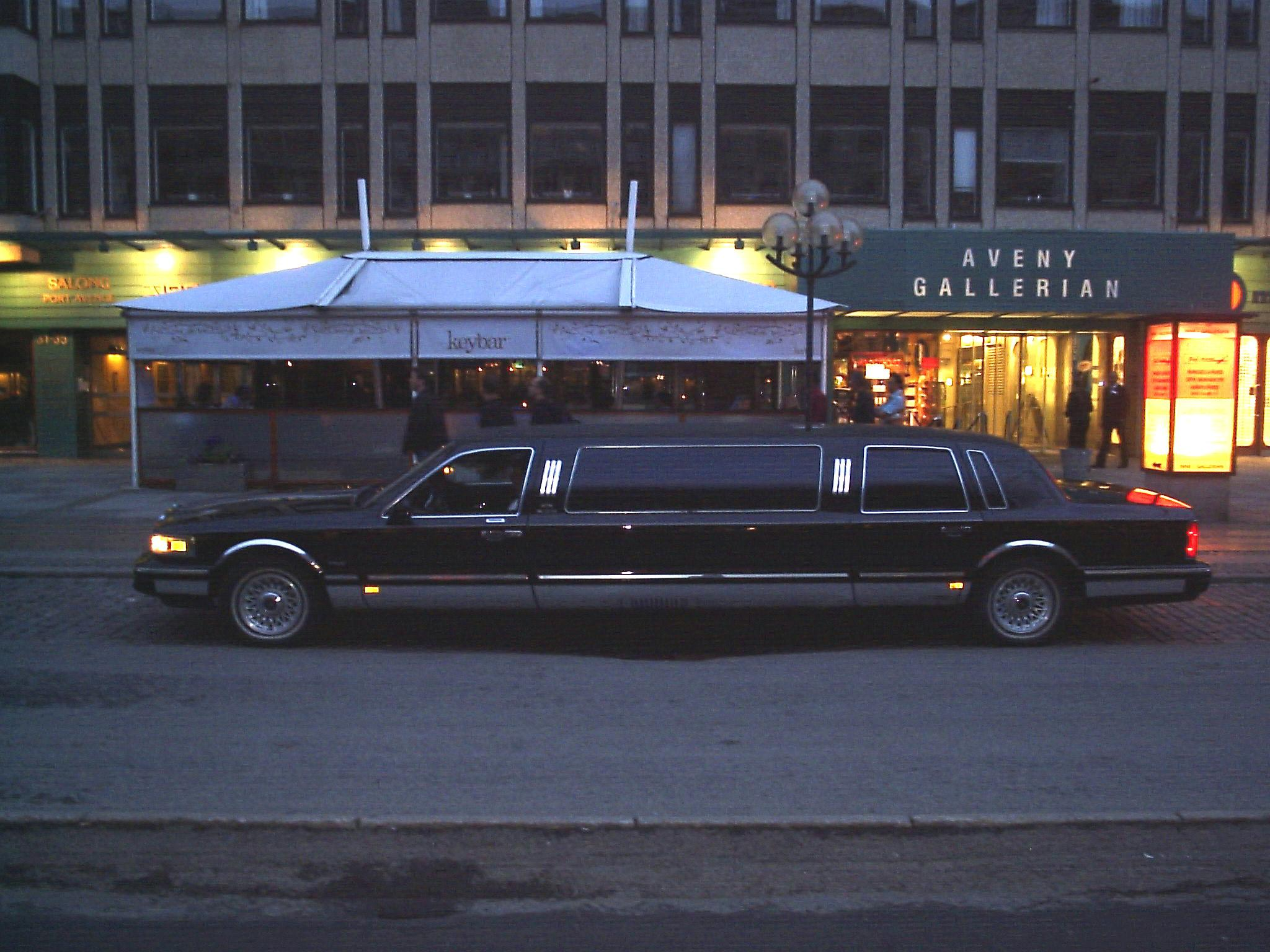
Limousine

A frequent wedding tradition in the United States involves the decoration of the vehicle the bride and groom drive at the conclusion of the wedding ceremony. Typically, various ribbons and streamers are attached, and words written upon the surface of the vehicle, and often tin cans are attached to its fenders or bumpers by strings to serve as noisemakers. Jan Brunvand's American Folklore: An Encyclopedia speculates that the decoration of the car and its equipment with noisemakers may perpetuate the shivaree, a custom in which newlyweds were given a noisy serenade; when honeymoon travel became a custom, it made a traditional local shivaree impractical, so the vehicle is given a noisy sendoff instead.

Some cars are used chiefly for special occasions and social rituals, such as limousines.

== Truck drivers and taxicab drivers ==
Trucks and truck drivers

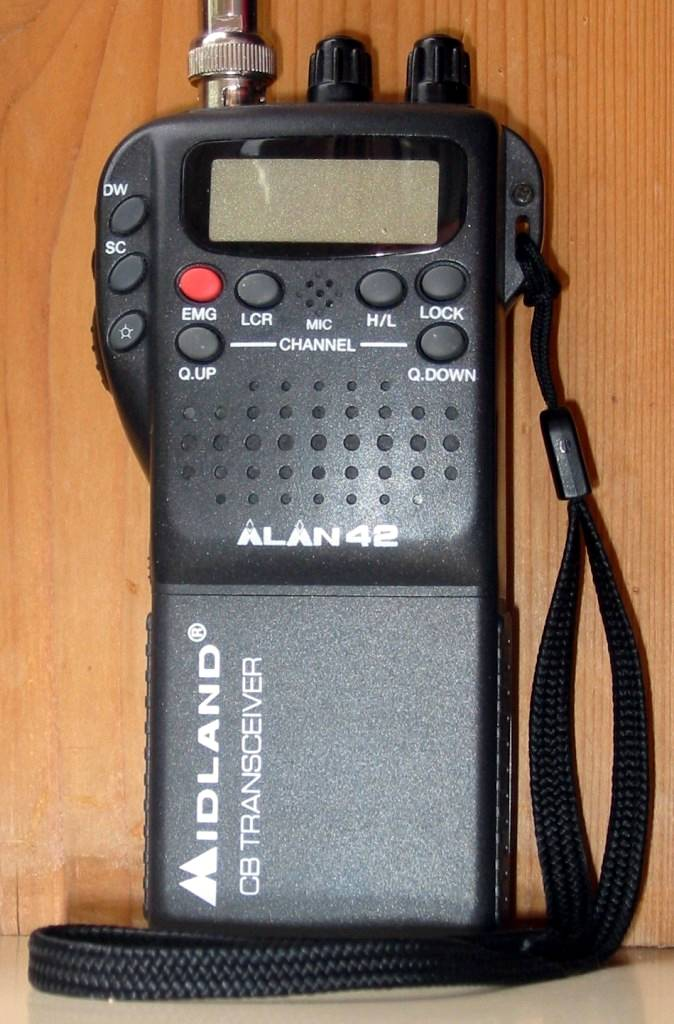
CB radio

Various professions revolving around motor vehicles acquire a folklore of their own. Truck drivers, since they usually drive alone, tend to develop a social network of their own. They circulate a number of tall tales that relate generally to their profession, usually involving the outwitting of state police and other traffic or tax authorities. They also create an elaborate body of customs and lore surrounding the use of citizen's band radio, with its own jargon and "handles", which came to national notice in the 1970s. A widespread bit of popular folklore circulated among other motorists is that truck drivers knew which restaurants to patronize and which to avoid, so eateries that were obviously frequented by truck drivers were esteemed by the general public. With the rise of national restaurant chains, this bit of folklore is fading.

Similar folklore surrounds taxicab drivers, involving the tales they tell among each other and the tales that circulate about them.

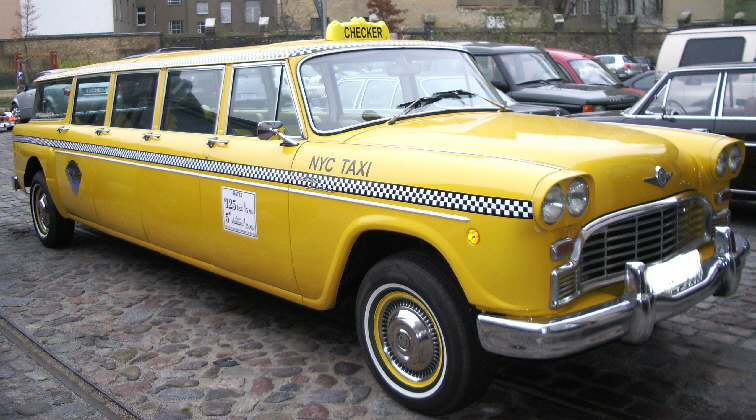
Taxicab

== Car coining ==
There is a practice in New Jersey and New York of tossing a few coins onto the floor of a newly purchased car as a sign of good luck. This practice originated as a practical one. Because of the area's many toll roads, many drivers would carry change in their cars. The friends and family of the new car owner would throw coins onto the floor of the new car so if the driver ever ran out of their own money, they could always reach down and find some extra money on the floor.
