= Passamezzo =

Italian folk dance

The passamezzo (plural: passamezzi or passamezzos) is an Italian folk dance of the 16th and early 17th centuries.

Many pieces named "passamezzo" follow one of two chord progressions that came to be named after the dance, passamezzo antico and passamezzo moderno. The chord progression would be repeated numerous times in succession while the dance was being performed.

According to Renaissance practices, the passamezzo dance is often followed by other dances in a triple time, such as the saltarello, gagliarda or paduana.

== Name ==
There are many variant spellings. In Italian or international usage, the name is also rendered as pass'e mez(z)o, passo e mezzo, and passomez(z)o. In early English usage, the names frequently incorporated the word measure in a folk etymology, giving such renderings as passemeasure, passingmeasure, passy-measures or passemeasure(s) pavan, particularly to designate the passamezzo antico progression. Passamezzi following the passamezzo moderno progression are designated "quadro pavan" or "quadran(t) pavan."

== Influence ==
French printed collections of passamezzo antico settings emerged in the 1550s, edited by Claude Gervaise for Attaingnant and Jean d’Estrée for du Chemin. Catherine de’ Medici’s fondness for dancing encouraged the Franco-Italian musical exchange, as well as to promote a French counterpart to the Florentine Intermedii.
