= Marco Uccellini =

Italian composer (1603/10–1680)

Marco Uccellini (Forlimpopoli, Forlì 1603 or 1610 - 10 December 1680) was an Italian Baroque violinist and composer. His output of mainly secular music for solo violin is considered to have been important in the rise of independent instrumental classical music, and in development of violin technique.

== Life ==
Uccellini's life, like many composers of the 17th century, is not well documented; however, enough information exists to create a rough biography. He was born into a reasonably affluent noble family in Forlimpopoli, Forlì, who had owned land in the area since the early 14th century. Many members of the family held ecclesiastical posts locally, including Uccellini's father Pietro Maria, and it is likely that Marco went to study at the seminary in Assisi sometime in the early 1630s. Evidence from his will suggests that Uccellini began his formal musical education there, possibly under another notable early violinist-composer, Giovanni Battista Buonamente, who was then serving as music director (maestro di cappella) at the Basilica of Saint Francis of Assisi.

He became Capo degl’instrumentisti of the Este court in Modena from 1641 to 1662, and was the maestro di cappella of the Modena cathedral from 1647 to 1665. According to payroll records and remnants of Uccellini's correspondence, it is clear that he was a valued advisor and confidant to the d'Este family, paid almost eight times more than the other court violinists. Following the devolution of the Estense Chapel upon the accession of Duke Alfonso IV d'Este, Uccellini was let go from his position. However, he was soon re-employed as the maestro di cappella at the Farnese court in Parma until his death; he received this job mainly through the assistance of Isabella d'Este, who recently married into the Farnese family. At the Farnese court, he composed operas and ballets, but none of this music survives; thus, he is mainly known today for his instrumental music.

Uccellini was one of a line of distinguished Italian violinist-composers in the first half of the 17th century. His sonatas for violin and continuo contributed to the development of an idiomatic style of writing for the violin (including virtuosic runs, leaps, and forays into high positions), expanding the instrument's technical capabilities and expressive range. Like other 17th-century Italian sonatas, Uccellini's consist of short contrasting sections (frequently dances) that flow one into another. Uccellini's innovations influenced a generation of Austro-German violinist-composers including Johann Heinrich Schmelzer, Heinrich Ignaz Biber, and Johann Jakob Walther.

== Works ==
Uccellini mainly composed instrumental music, of which seven collections were published. Some examples are:

- Salmi a 1, a 3, 4, et a 5 concertati parte con istromenti e parte senza con Letanie della Beata Vergine Concertate a 5 con istromenti, Op. 6 (Venice, 1654)
- Ozio regio, Op. 7 (Venice, 1660 and Antwerp, 1668)
- Sinfonie Boscarecie, Op. 8, a collection of 37 small pieces for violin and basso continuo joined ad libitum by a second and third violins. The first edition of the sheet music was printed in Venice in 1660 but a version reprinted in Antwerp in 1669 was used in the freely available version Sinfonie Boscarecie
- Sinfonici concerti brevi e facili, Op. 9

He also composed one opera, Gli eventi di Filandro ad Edessa, which premiered in Parma in 1675.

== Contributions to Violin Playing ==
It can be assumed from the highly idiomatic and virtuosic nature of Uccellini's violin compositions that he was himself a brilliant violinist. Besides introducing several technical innovations necessary to play his difficult music, he was an early popularizer of music written explicitly for solo violin and continuo; at the time, it was common for composers not to specify instruments in their works, preferring to write parts adaptable between instruments of similar ranges.

== Selected discography ==
- Don Marco Uccellini: Sonata over Canzoni Op 5 (1649). Performed by Arparla with Davide Monti (baroque violin) and Maria Christina Cleary (arpa doppia). Stradivarius STR 37023, 2015. http://www.stradivarius.it/scheda.php?ID=801157037023500
- Marco Uccellini: Sonatas. Performed by Romanesca, a trio with Andrew Manze (violin), Nigel North (theorbo, archlute, Baroque guitar), and John Toll (harpsichord, organ) and excellent liner notes by Manze. Released in 1999. Harmonia Mundi 907196
- Marco Uccellini: La Hortensia Virtuosa. Performed by Bob van Asperen (harpsichord), Lucy Van Dael (violin), Jaap ter Linden (cello), and Toyohiko Satoh (lute). Released in 2007. Aeolus 10096
