= Melody type =

Set of melodic formulas, figures, and patterns

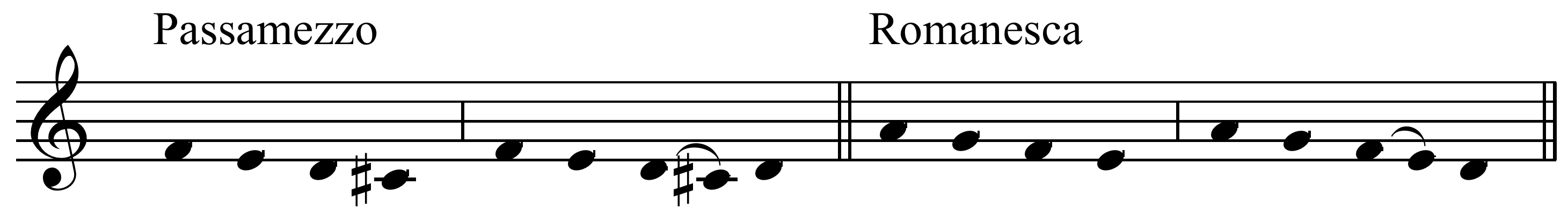
Passamezzo and Romanesca melodic formula on D.

Melody type or type-melody is a set of melodic formulas, figures, and patterns.

== Term and typical meanings ==
"Melody type" is a fundamental notion for understanding a nature of Western and non-Western musical modes, according to Harold Powers' seminal article "Mode" in the first edition of the New Grove Dictionary of Music and Musicians (Powers 1980, 12:376–77, 379, et passim).

Melody types are used in the composition of an enormous variety of music, especially non-Western and early Western music. Such music is generally composed by a process of centonization, either freely (i.e. improvised) or in a fixed pattern.

"Melody type" as used by the ethnomusicologist Mark Slobin (1982, 186) is defined as a "group of melodies that are related, in that they all contain similar modal procedures and characteristic rhythmic and melodic contours or patterns".

Most cultures which compose music in this way organize the patterns into distinct melody types. These are often compared to modern Western scales, but they in fact represent much more information than a sequence of permissible pitches, since they include how those pitches should function in the music, and indicate basic formulas which serve as a basis for improvisation. In non-improvised music, such as codified liturgical music, it is still usually clear how the melody developed from set patterns.

On one end of the continuum, the right, the melody type is a schema that is quite definite—a specific melody or a tune. When a musician improvises on this schema, he [or she] plays the melody with only slight variations. The basic outline is preserved and is clearly recognized by the listener. The best example ... on this end of the continuum is a folk song. A genuine folk song performance is a kind of improvisation. No one person sings it exactly as it came to him [or her]. One of the challenges of folk song research, of course, is to find all the variants of the tune and to try to trace the family relationships.
On the left side of the continuum is the melody type as a mode. Here the melody type is similar to a church mode: a scalar configuration with a preferential order of tones.
...The closer we get to the pole where a melody type is a tune, the more definite and literal is the schema.

— May (1983)

A melodic formula, ranging length from a short motif of a few notes to an entire melody, which is used as the basis for musical compositions. It differs from a mode, which simply sets forth a sequence of intervals (in Western music, half tones and whole tones), and from a scale (the notes of a mode in rising order of pitch), in that it is more specific: a melody type spells out actual sequences of tones, just as they are to appear in a piece, as well as particular beginnings and endings, ornaments, and other details. Melody types are found mostly in the music of ancient peoples—the Greeks, Hebrews, and others—and of Eastern peoples—the Arabs, Persians (Iranians), Indians, and others. For...example... raga.

— Ammer (2004)

== Melodic formulae and melody types in monodic traditions around the world ==
- Nomos in Ancient Greek music

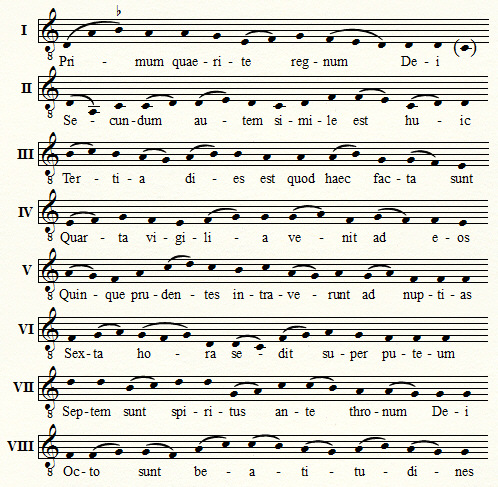
Ancient type-melodies for 8 church ('Gregorian') tones. Transcribed from the South-French tonary of the 10th century (Ms.: F-Pn lat. 1121, fol. 201v-205v). Pseudo-liturgical verses with initial numerals (primum..., secundum..., tertia... etc.) helped singers to associate a current model with a 'real' chant (such as antiphon) of the same tone. These type-melodies were probably conceived as didactic, to adjust ear for typical melodic formulae, reciting tones, finals etc. They should not be confused with psalm tones, which represent an exact scheme for modulating psalms and canticles.

- Intonation formula (Latin: intonatio, euouae, Noeane etc.) in Gregorian chant as used in psalm tones and certain genres such as the Tract
- Enechema (Ancient Greek: ἐνήχημα) in Byzantine chant
- Popevka (Russian: попевка) in Znamenny chant
- Khaz in Armenian chant
- All Near and Middle East maqam-traditions (Arabic Maqam, Turkish Makam, Kurdish Meqam, Uyghur Muqam, Azeri Mugam, Uzbek and Tadzhik Shashmakom, Persian Dastgah etc.)
- Raga in Indian music
- Pathet in Indonesian music
- Chōshi in Japanese music

== Extra-musical implications ==
In most cases, these melody types are associated with extra-musical implications, particularly emotions (see Indian rasa, for instance). They are also often associated with certain times. For example, most ragas are associated with a certain time of day, or a wayang performance in Java implies a certain succession of pathets.

Many of these traditions have a corresponding rhythmic framework. These include:

- Usul in Arabian and Turkish music
- Tala in Indian music
- Bentuk in Javanese music

== See also ==
- Formula composition
- Matrix
- Modal frame

== Sources ==
- Powers, Harold S. (1980). "Mode". The New Grove Dictionary of Music and Musicians, edited by Stanley Sadie. London: Macmillan Publishers.
- Slobin, Mark (1982). Tenement Songs: The Popular Music of the Jewish Immigrants. Music in American Life. Urbana: University of Illinois Press. ISBN 0-252-00893-6
