= Melodic pattern =

Musical figure used for repetitive sequences.

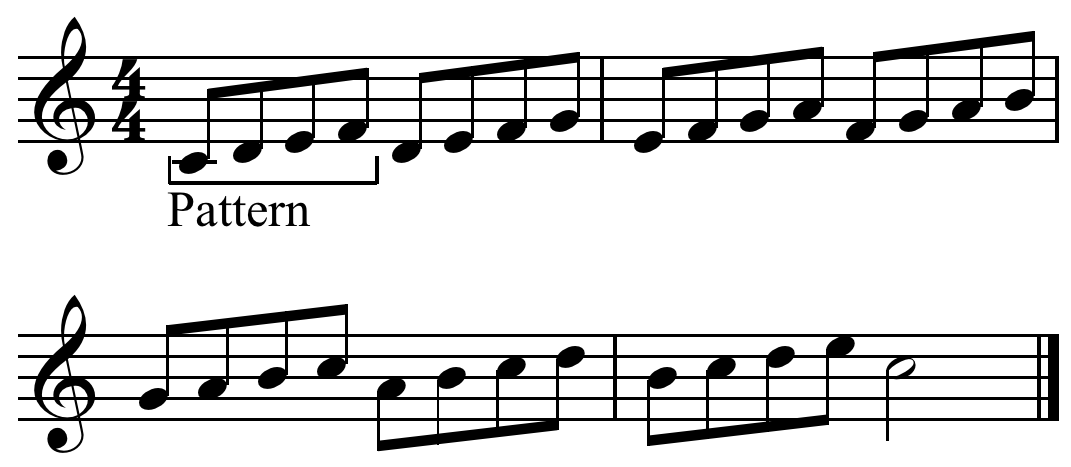
Simple melodic pattern.

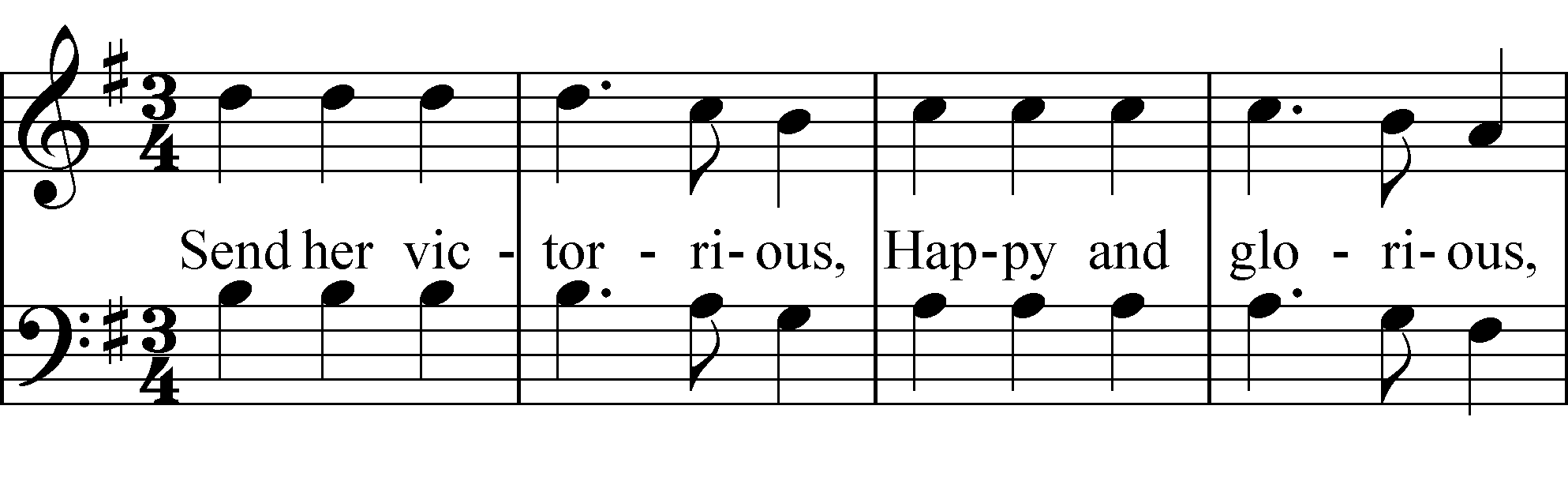
Melodic sequence on the lines "Send her victorious," and "Happy and glorious," from "God Save the Queen"

In music and jazz improvisation, a melodic pattern (or motive) is a cell or germ serving as the basis for repetitive pattern. It is a figure that can be used with any scale. It is used primarily for solos because, when practiced enough, it can be extremely useful when improvising. "Sequence" refers to the repetition of a part at a higher or lower pitch, and melodic sequence is differentiated from harmonic sequence. One example of melodic motive and sequence are the pitches of the first line, "Send her victorious," repeated, a step lower, in the second line, "Happy and glorious," from "God Save the Queen".

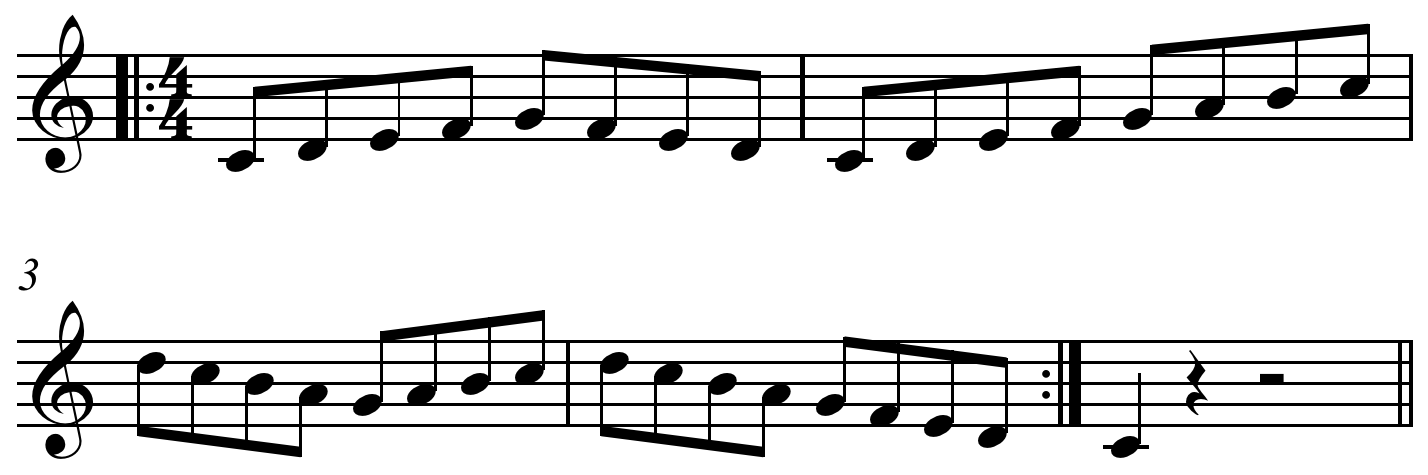
Melodic pattern in C major.

"A melodic pattern is just what the name implies: a melody with some sort of fixed pattern to it." "The strong theme or motive is stated. It is repeated more or less exactly, but at a different pitch level."

== See also ==
- Color (isorhythm)
- Imitation (music)
- Melody type
- Lick (music)
- Phrase (music)
