= Passamezzo moderno =

Chord progression

The passamezzo moderno ("modern half step"; also quadran, quadrant, or quadro pavan), or Gregory Walker was "one of the most popular harmonic formulae in the Renaissance period, divid[ing] into two complementary strains thus:"

1)	I	IV	I	V
2)	I	IV	I–V	I

For example, in C major the progression is as follows:

C	F	C	G	C	F	C–G	C

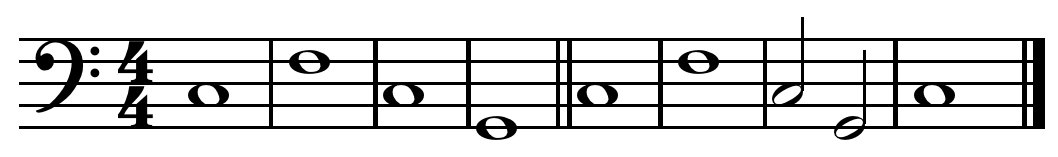
Gregory Walker root progression (Note: Caution: Keeping all chords in root position without using a stepwise melody produces parallel fifths (see parallel harmony), which are prohibited by classical (rather than popular) voice-leading rules. The following files may or may not be more suitable for use in strict counterpoint, though they lack the ground bass. Progression with tonic (I) chord in root position Tonic in first inversion Tonic in second inversion)

The progression or ground bass, the major mode variation of the passamezzo antico, originated in Italian and French dance music during the first half of the 16th century, where it was often used with a contrasting progression or section known as ripresa. Though one of Thomas Morley's characters in Plaine and Easie Introduction to Practicall Musicke denigrates the Gregory Walker, comparing unskilled singing to its sound, it was popular in both pop/popular/folk and classical musics through 1700. Its popularity was revived in the mid 19th century, and the American variant (below) evolved into the twelve bar blues.

== Examples ==
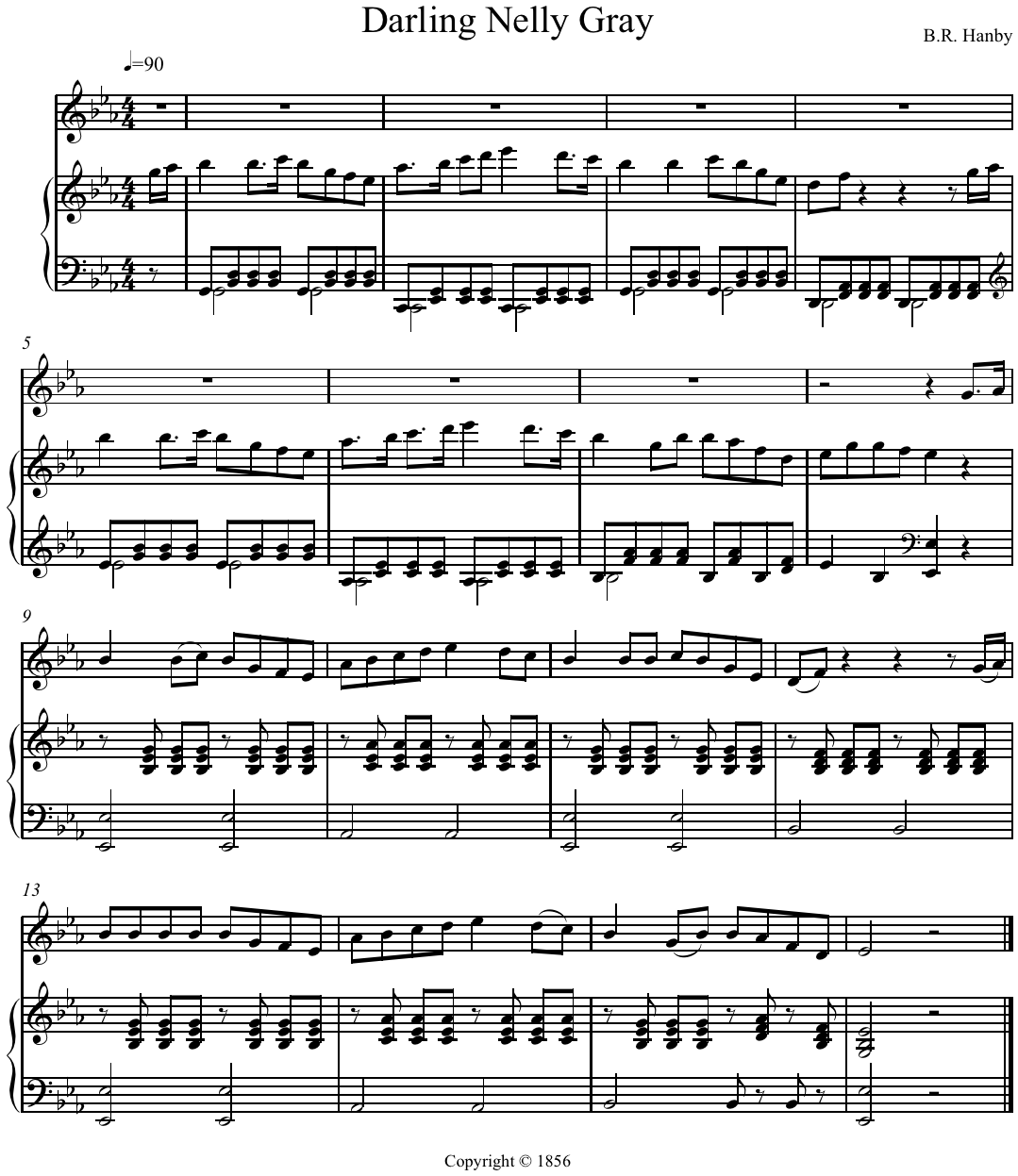
"Darling Nelly Gray", page one

Listed in van der Merwe (1989, 198–201):

- several in The Fitzwilliam Virginal Book
- "Up and Ware Them A Willie"
- "Jimmie Rose"
- "Darling Nelly Gray"
- "Wreck of the Old 97"
- Woody Guthrie's "There is a House in This Old Town"
- Irving Berlin's "Alexander's Ragtime Band"
- The Rolling Stones' "Honky Tonk Women" (1969)
- Carole King's "You've Got a Friend" (1971)

Listed in Helms, Ilmbrecht, and Dieckelmann (1954, ):

- Hans Neusidler's Gassenhauer (Nuremberg, 1536)
- "Oxstedter Mühle" (folk dance from Lower Saxony) (B section)
- Diego Ortiz' Recercada Prima / Segunda / Tercera sobre el Passamezzo Moderno (three-part didactic composition in Tratado de Glosas sobre cláusulas y Otros Generos de Puntos en la Música de Violones, 1553). (Readers of Spanish may benefit from the Spanish-language Wikipedia's more extensive treatment of Diego Ortiz and of the Tratado de Glosas.)

Others:

- Iron & Wine's "A History of Lovers" (verses; chorus and interludes follow ripresi IV–I–IV–V progression)
- Ed Rush and George Cromarty’s "Plastic Jesus"

== American Gregory Walker ==
The American Gregory Walker, popular in parlour music, is a variation in which the subdominant (IV) chords become the progression IV–I.

1)	I	IV–I	I	V
2)	I	IV–I	I–V	I

For example, in C major this variation is as follows:

C	F–C	C	G	C	F–C	C–G	C

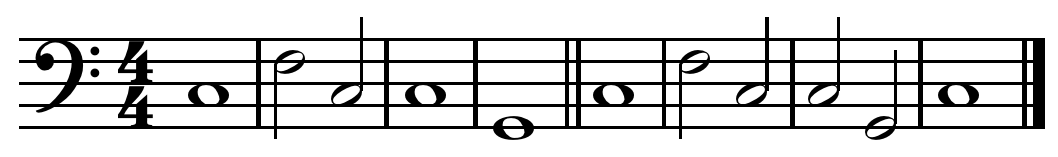
American Gregory Walker root progression

=== Examples ===
Listed in van der Merwe (1989, 201–202):

- "Jesse James"
- "The Titanic"
- "My Little Old Sod Shanty"
- "Cottonfields"
- Gus Cannon's "Walk Right In" (1929)

== Other variations ==
=== On original progression ===
- Second strain's first I becomes I–I^{7} (for a stronger "lead-in" to the upcoming IV):

- "Gathering Flowers From the Hillside": The Bluegrass variation frequently occurs in conjunction with the I–I^{7} "lead-in" and/or the direct IV-to-V transition listed above.
  The resulting progression is ||| I | I | I | V || I(–I^{7}) | IV | (I–)V | I ||| ; examples include:

- "Free Little Bird" (David Holt and Doc and Merle Watson; not to be confused with Lynyrd Skynyrd's "Free Bird").

=== On American variant ===
- IV–I is reversed, becoming I–IV or I^{7}–IV:

- "Tennessee Waltz" (Stewart and King 1947) (verse and second strain of chorus)
