= Li Eventi di Filandro Et Edessa =

1675 opera by Marco Uccellini

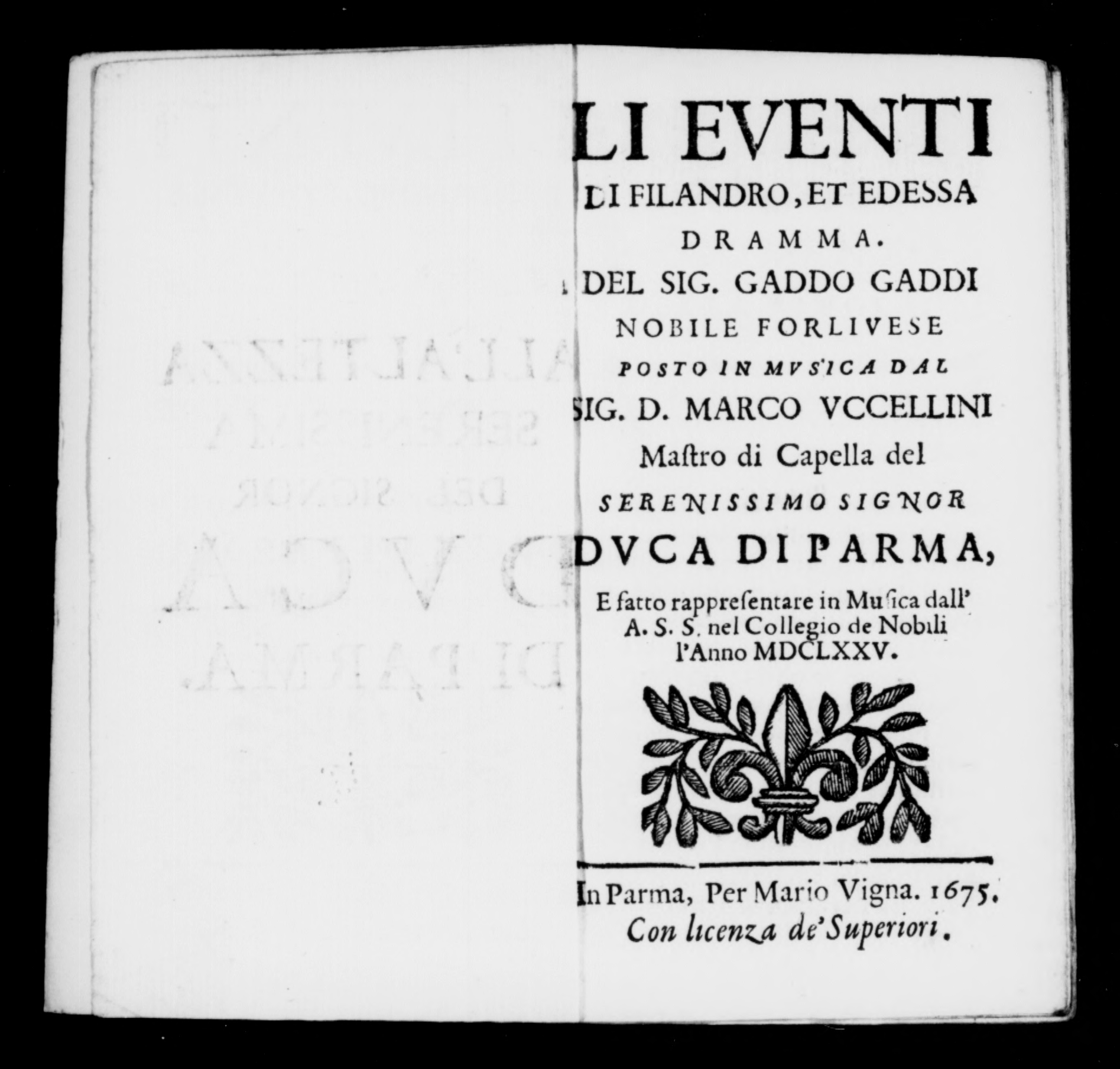
Frontispiece of the libretto for ‘Li Eventi di Filandro et Edessa’

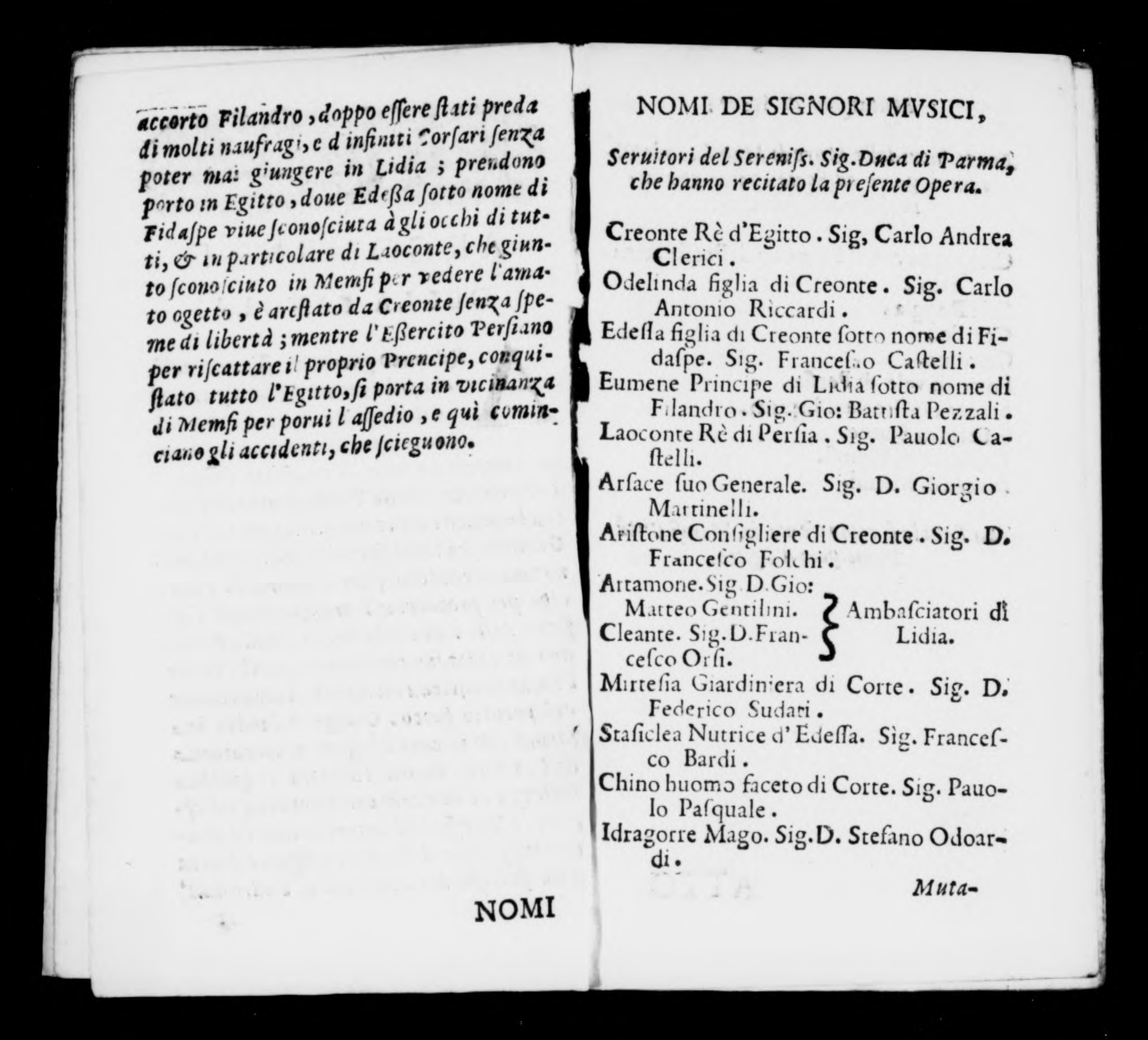
Original cast of ‘Li Eventi di Filandro et Edessa’

Li Eventi di Filandro Et Edessa is an opera by Marco Uccellini based on a libretto by Gaddo Gaddi. It was first performed at the Teatro del Collegio dei Nobili in Parma in 1675.

== Action ==
Creonte, king of Egypt is at war with Artaserse, King of Persia, but Artaserse’s son prince Laoconte is in love with Edessa, daughter of Creonte. Laoconte sends his trusted friend Filandro of Lydia to Edessa, but he then falls in love with her himself. Edessa in turn falls in love with him; she escapes from court and attempts to flee with him to Lydia but they are shipwrecked and seized by pirates. Eventually they return to Egypt where they live in hiding. Laoconte comes to Egypt to press his own suit but Creonte imprisons him, whereupon the Persians invade and conquer Egypt.

== Music ==
Although the libretto has survived, Uccellini’s score has not.

== Original cast ==
Carlo Andrea Clerici (Creonte), Carlo Antonio Riccardi (Odelinda), Francesco Castelli (Edessa), Giovanni Battista Pezzali (Eumene/Filandro), Pauolo Castelli (Laoconte), Giorgio Martinelli (Arsace), Francesco Folchi (Aristone), Giovanni Matteo Gentilini (Attamone), Francesco Orsi (Cleante), Federico Sudari (Mirtesia), Francesco Bardi (Stasiclea), Pauolo Pasquale (Chino), Stefano Odoardi (Idragorre).
