= Modal frame =

Recurring pattern of modes or scales that shapes a piece's tonal color

A modal frame in music is "a number of types permeating and unifying African, European, and American song" and melody. It may also be called a melodic mode. "Mode" and "frame" are used interchangeably in this context without reference to scalar or rhythmic modes. Melodic modes define and generate melodies that are not determined by harmony, but purely by melody. A note frame, is a melodic mode that is atonic (without a tonic), or has an unstable tonic.

Modal frames may be defined by their:

- floor note: the bottom of the frame, felt to be the lowest note, though isolated notes may go lower,
- ceiling note: the top of the frame,
- central note: the center around which other notes cluster or gravitate,
- upper or lower focus: portion of the mode on which the melody temporarily dwells, and can also defined by melody types, such as:
  - chant tunes: (Bob Dylan's "Subterranean Homesick Blues")
  - axial tunes: ("A Hard Day's Night", "Peggy Sue", Marvin Gaye's "Can I Get A Witness", and Roy Milton's "Do the Hucklebuck")
  - oscillating: (Rolling Stones' "Jumpin' Jack Flash")
  - open/closed: (Bo Diddley's "Hey Bo Diddley")
  - terrace
  - shout-and-fall
  - ladder of thirds

"Chel-sea" football crowd chant: minor third.

Further defined features include:

- melodic dissonance: the quality of a note that is modally unstable and attracted to other more important tones in a non-harmonic way
- melodic triad: arpeggiated triads in a melody. A non-harmonic arpeggio is most commonly a melodic triad, it is an arpeggio the notes of which do not appear in the harmony of the accompaniment.
- level: a temporary modal frame contrasted with another built on a different foundation note. A change in levels is called a shift.
- co-tonic: a melodic tonic different from and as important as the harmonic tonic
- secondary tonic: a melodic tonic different from but subordinate to the harmonic tonic
- pendular third: alternating notes a third apart, most often a neutral, see double tonic

== Shout-and-fall ==
Shout-and-fall or tumbling strain is a modal frame, "very common in Afro-American-derived styles" and featured in songs such as "Shake, Rattle and Roll" and "My Generation".

"Gesturally, it suggests 'affective outpouring', 'self-offering of the body', 'emptying and relaxation'." The frame may be thought of as a deep structure common to the varied surface structures of songs in which it occurs.

Shout-and-fall example.

== Ladder of thirds ==
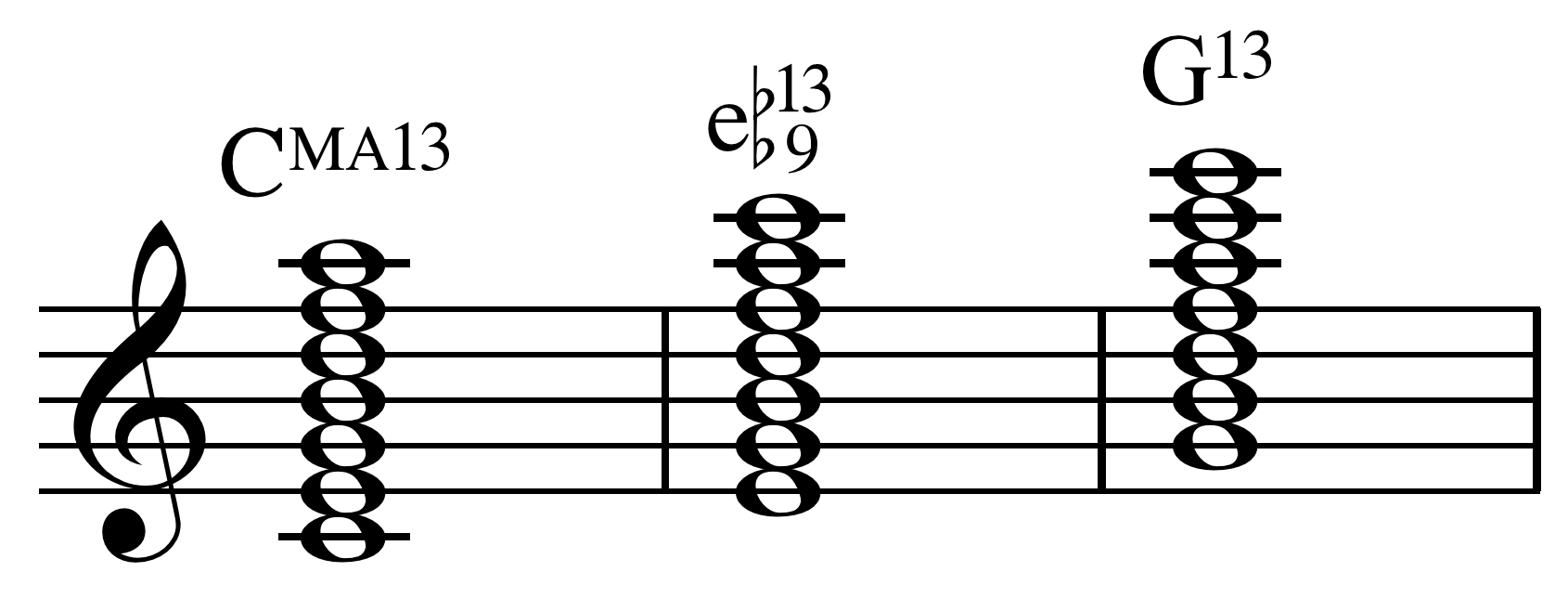
CM13, first inversion = e13(♭9), second inversion = G13... Eventually seven chords along a ladder of thirds.

A ladder of thirds (coined by van der Merwe 1989, adapted from Curt Sachs) is similar to the circle of fifths, though a ladder of thirds differs in being composed of thirds, major or minor, and may or may not circle back to its starting note and thus may or may not be an interval cycle.

Triadic chords may be considered as part of a ladder of thirds.

It is a modal frame found in Blues and British folk music. Though a pentatonic scale is often analyzed as a portion of the circle of fifths, the blues scale and melodies in that scale come "into being through piling up thirds below and/or above a tonic or central note."

They are "commonplace in post-rock 'n' roll popular music – and also appear in earlier tunes". Examples include The Beatles' "A Hard Day's Night", Buddy Holly's "Peggy Sue" and The Who's "My Generation", Ben Harney's "You've Been A Good Old Wagon" (1895) and Ben Bernie et al.'s "Sweet Georgia Brown" (1925).

=== Example ===
The modal frame of The Beatles' "A Hard Day's Night" features a ladder of thirds axially centered on G with a ceiling note of B♭ and floor note of E[♭] (the low C being a passing tone):

"A Hard Day's Night" modal frame.

According to Middleton, the song, "at first glance major-key-with-modal-touches", reveals through its "Line of Latent Mode" "a deep kinship with typical blues melodic structures: it is centred on three of the notes of the minor-pentatonic mode [on C: C, E-flat, F, G, B-flat] (E♭-G-B♭), with the contradictory major seventh (B♮) set against that. Moreover, the shape assumed by these notes – the modal frame – as well as the abstract scale they represent, is revealed, too; and this – an initial, repeated circling round the dominant (G), with an excursion to its minor third (B♭), 'answered' by a fall to the 'symmetrical' minor third of the tonic (E♭) – is a common pattern in blues."

== See also ==
- Melodic motion
- Tune-family
