= Level (music) =

Aspect of melodic and musical harmony

A level, also "tonality level", Gerhard Kubik's "tonal step," "tonal block," and John Blacking's "root progression," is an important melodic and harmonic progression where melodic material shifts between a whole tone above and a whole tone below the tonal center. This shift can occur to both neighboring notes, in either direction, and from any point of departure. The steps above and below the tonic are often called contrasting steps. A new harmonic segment is created which then changes the tonality but not necessarily the key.

Each level is based on one pitch, a foundation note. A melodic or harmonic-melodic third, triad (fifth) (such as in the song "Shallow Brown"), or seventh (such as in the song "Donald MacGillavry") may be built off this foundation. A "change" in levels is called a shift. We see this in double-tonic tunes such as "Donald MacGillavry" (notes: A to G in bar 4 below). Shifting is more emphatic than chord changes (chords: Am-G), but not as emphatic as modulations (keys: A minor to G major):

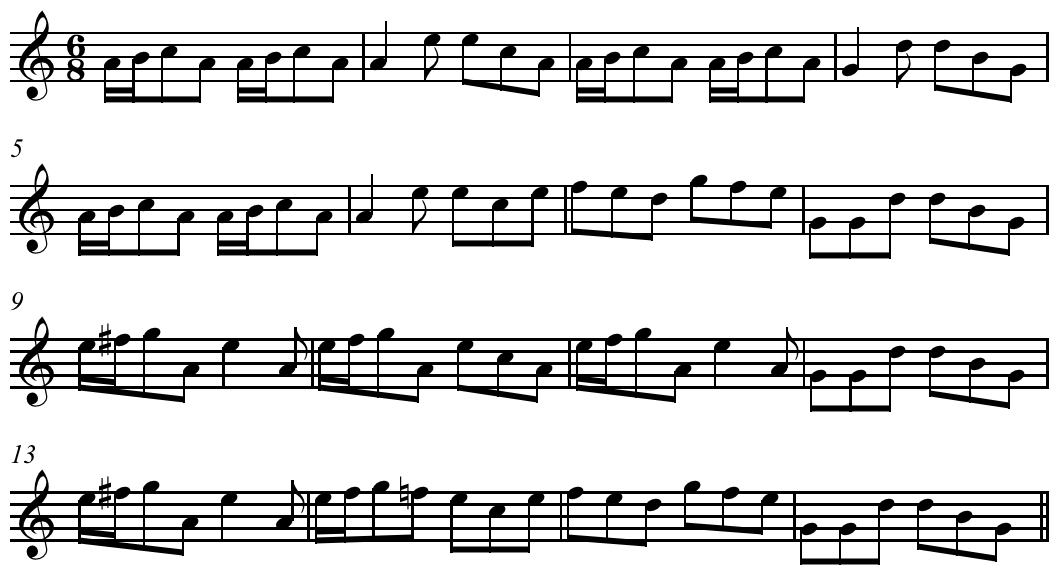
"Donald MacGillavry", last measure each line

The foundation (root) is the most important note and accompanying chords are almost always built in root position. The fifth is next in importance, and consecutive fifths are most often emphasized. The third is less important and often blue, neutral, or changing from major to minor. This characteristic is common in the English virginalists music such as William Byrd's "The Woods so Wild" theme, which is an example of levels (F and G) being elaborated through cadence, melodic divergence from the accompaniment, and subsidiary chords, reaching a complete cadential phrase.

Levels are commonly found in African folk music. It is believed that they originally arose out of this culture. They are often combined with unresolved harmonic progression that gives music a feeling of perpetual motion without any noticeable cadence. Runs and sequences often link new harmonic segments of the music to the previous ones. Each new harmonic sequence is often related to the previous through the melodic line. The music often ends suddenly without any musical preparation, even in the middle of a phrase. Sometimes the music descends to a "point of rest" in which the note below the tonal center gets extended to allow an ending. Tonal variety and melodic unification is often achieved by repeating similar phrases on different steps of a pentatonic mode. Semitonal and hemitonal root progressions can also be found. Tonality levels or "root progression" are the most important structural feature found in African folk music. The internal organization of this music demands occasional shifts between levels unless the music is based on a consistent drone. The tonality level often shifts several times making it very hard to find a piece of African folk music without tonality levels. Most often between three and five tonality levels can be found within a composition. Levels can also be found in Asian, Celtic folk musics, Arab, and in European Renaissance music.

Eventually, levels and other musical traits found their way into American jazz harmony and blues tonality through spirituals. Levels can be compared to a traditional root progression in western music with a tonic – subdominant – dominant relationship. Levels give way to familiar classical chords and chord changes in Baroque music. The harmonic practices between these cultures are so similar that urban African composers often incorporate western root progression into their local harmonic practices. As this combination traveled to America, it helped create new genres such as jazz, big band, and blues. In the twentieth century, chords give way to levels in the blues, completed with the V-IV-I progression, which spread to all popular music. For instance, In the blues – influenced style, the boogie-woogie bass, levels occur in shifts from primary triads rather than neighboring tones. This can be directly tied to the tonality levels found in African folk music discussed earlier.

A level, or "tonal step," often coincides with cross-rhythms in the melody and entries in vocal melody. A new tonality level and harmonic shift is often very vague and hard to identify in a vocal texture. However, it is much easier to identify in thick instrumentation.

== See also ==
- Phrase modulation
- Theory of levels
