= Tune-family =

In folk music a tune-family is, "a seeming multiplicity of melodies," reducible, "to a small number of 'models' or sets." One can think of the models or sets as deep structures. Often, "different tunes are the same," and, "the same tune is different."

Idiolectical (individual) or dialectical (based on context or on locale) variations may exist. Different families may also arise from the use of stock structures or formulae such as stock phrases and motifs.

== See also ==
- Modal frame
- Matrix (music)
- Tune (folk music)
