= Dargason =

"Dargason" is a seventeenth-century English tune, and may refer to the following:

- The fourth movement, "Fantasia on the 'Dargason'", from the Second Suite in F for Military Band by Gustav Holst
- The fourth movement, "Finale (The Dargason)", from St Paul's Suite, also by Gustav Holst
- "The Irish Washerwoman", a traditional jig claimed to be derived from the Dargason

Dargason may also refer to:

- Dargason (record label) - an independent record label specialising in Celtic music.
