= Nigel North =

English lutenist, musicologist, and pedagogue

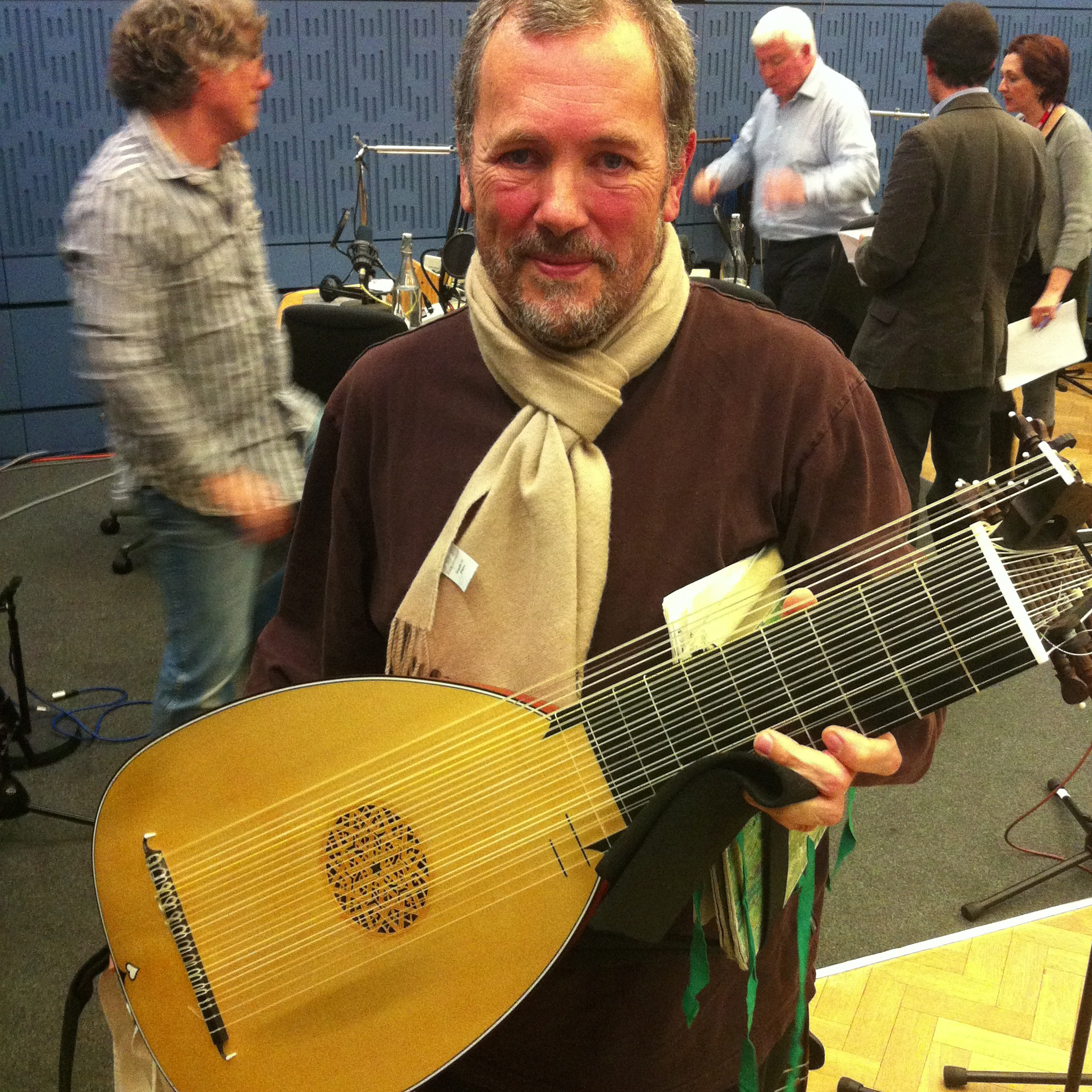
Nigel North (2012)

Nigel North (born 5 June 1954) is an English lutenist, musicologist, and pedagogue.

== Student days ==
He studied guitar on a scholarship to the junior department of the Guildhall School of Music and Drama (1964–70), taking up the lute in 1969, at the age of 15. He maintains he was more or less self-taught on the instrument. He went on to study at the Royal College of Music from 1971 to 1974: classical guitar with John Williams and Carlos Bonell, viola da gamba with Francis Baines; lute (one term) with Diana Poulton, qualifying in 1974 with an A.R.C.M. diploma in lute performance. He completed his studies on the postgraduate course in Early Music at the Guildhall School of Music and Drama 1975–1975 and with one month's study with baroque lutenist Michael Schäffer in 1976.

== Teaching ==
At the age of 21, he was appointed Professor of Lute at the Guildhall School for Music and Drama, a position he held until 1996. From 1993 to 1999 he was Professor of Historical Plucked Instruments at the Hochschule der Künste, Berlin, Germany. From January 1999 he has been Professor of Lute at the Early Music Institute, Jacobs School of Music, Indiana University and, from January 2005, has taught the lute at the Royal Conservatory of The Hague, Holland.

He is internationally recognized as the foremost authority on basso continuo for plucked instruments, and has written the standard modern textbook on continuo playing on the lute and related instruments:

- North, Nigel (1987). Continuo playing on the Lute, Archlute and Theorbo: a Comprehensive Guide for Performers. Indiana University Press. ISBN 0-253-31415-1. (review)

The following textbook is in preparation:

- Lute and Early Guitar - a Performance Practice Handbook Original didactic sources from 1500 - c.1760, for lute and guitar. Sources in facsimile, with translations and full editorial comment; covering the working repertoire of a modern lutenist. It will be a book in which one may find the answers to performance practice questions taken directly from original sources.

== Professional career ==
His recording life began in the mid-1970s; while studying at music college, he played viol, cittern, rebec and violin as well as his more usual instruments, lute, theorbo, mandolin and baroque guitar on recordings with some of the English pioneers of early music of that time, such as David Munrow with The Early Music Consort and Alfred Deller with The Deller Consort.

From 1974 to 1990 Nigel North played in baroque operas, baroque orchestras and chamber groups and accompanied singers in concerts, participating in over 100 recordings. Notable groups and people with whom he has worked:

- The English Concert (Trevor Pinnock)
- The Academy of Ancient Music (Christopher Hogwood)
- The Brandenburg Consort (Roy Goodman)
- Orchestra of the Age of Enlightenment (René Jacobs)
- Red Byrd
- Fretwork
- London Baroque
- Peter Pears (Aldeburgh Festival, 1976)
- James Bowman
- Michael Chance
- Nancy Argenta
- Emma Kirkby

With Andrew Manze (violin) and John Toll (harpsichord) he formed the ensemble Romanesca in 1988; they played together for the next 10 years.

His solo lute debut was a Bach programme at the Wigmore Hall in 1977; in 1985 he performed all of Bach's lute works for the first time in London. Numerous recitals and recordings followed and from 1984 to 2001 he toured worldwide.

I remember going to a remarkable recital, one which I wish I had the ability to give: it was one of Nigel North's Bach recitals, and I was bowled over by how masterful and how musical it was. A real musical experience, something you don't always get from guitar and lute players and which, in general, is pretty rare.

— Julian Bream, talk given to the Lute Society, September 2002, regarding a Bach recital given at the Wigmore Hall, 1996

He has made transcriptions for Baroque lute of Bach's complete solo violin works and solo cello suites, which he has performed at the Wigmore Hall and recorded on a 4-CD set, Bach on the Lute (1994–1998).

Other notable recordings include the complete lute works of John Dowland (4 CDs on Naxos Records), the complete lute works of Robert Johnson, as well as a critically acclaimed recording of "A Varietie of Lute Lessons," and a new series of CD's dedicated to the works of Sylvius Leopold Weiss, among many others.

== Published editions of lute music ==
- Oxford University Press Lute Series
- Lute Music by William Byrd (Volume 6), 1976
- Lute and Bandora Music by Alfonso Ferrabosco (Volume 8), 1979, Stainer and Bell
- Tablature for 2 Lutes Volumes 1 and 2 (English Renaissance Treble and Ground Duets), 1983, Faber Music/Indiana University Press
- Varietie of Lute Lessons, Robert Dowland's anthology of 1610 (in preparation).

== Sources ==
- Stephen Haynes: 'North, Nigel', Grove Music Online ed. L. Macy (Accessed 2007-05-06), <http://www.grovemusic.com >
- 'North, Nigel', Hutchinson Encyclopedia of Britain, Helicon Publishing, March 2005
