= Michael Schäffer (lutenist) =

German lutenist

Michael Schäffer (11 November 1937 – 7 September 1978) was a German lutenist associated with the early music revival of the 20th century. He specialized in Renaissance and Baroque lute repertory, particularly French Baroque music, and was among the performers associated with the revival of historically informed lute technique during the postwar period.

== Early life and education ==
Schäffer was born in Cologne. He was the son of the violinist Kurt Schäffer, founder of the Schäffer Quartet. He received a musical education, as a violinist and violist, with his father Kurt Schäffer at the Robert Schumann Hochschule. before turning to the guitar and later the lute. His formal education took place at Staatliche Musikhochschule in Cologne where he majored in lute.

== Career ==
Schäffer's first academic appointment began in 1963 at the Bergische Musikschule in Wuppertal. In 1966, he became an original faculty member of the newly established Institute for Early music at the Rheinische Musikschule, where he lectured on the lute, theorbo and chitarrone.

He also taught at the Hochschule für Musik Köln.

Among the musicians who studied with Schäffer was the English lutenist Nigel North, who received an Arts Council scholarship to study Baroque lute technique with him in Cologne in the 1970s.

== Performance practice ==
Schäffer performed both as a soloist and chamber musician and became particularly associated with French Baroque lute repertory. He was a pioneer in the rediscovery of French Baroque lute works and concertised internationally as soloist and with chamber ensembles.

Schäffer was associated with the revival of historically informed lute performance practice during the postwar early music movement. He became known for his use of historical right-hand techniques, including the "thumb-under" position, at a time when many modern lutenists still employed guitar-derived lute technique.

His recordings of French Baroque lute music contributed to renewed interest in the repertory during the 20th-century early music revival.

== Teaching and legacy ==
Among the musicians who studied with Schäffer was the English lutenist Nigel North, who undertook studies with him in 1976.

Following Schäffer's death in 1978, the Journal of the Lute Society of America published a memorial tribute dedicated to him by Franklin Lei, Catherine Liddell Strizich and Robert Strizich.

Schäffer is cited among the figures associated with the 20th-century revival of historical lute performance practice.

== Discography ==
- French Lute Music. Turnabout/Vox, 1968.
  - Digital archive: French Lute Music
- Music for Lute and Strings with Eva Nagora, Franz Beyer and Thomas Blees.
  - Includes works by Joseph Haydn and Antonio Vivaldi.
  - Later compiled on the Vox CD anthology Music for Lute, Guitar, and Mandolin.
- The Baroque Lute (recorded 1977; released posthumously in 1979).
- French Baroque Lute Suites. Sony Classical CD reissue, 1997.
  - Review: Goldberg Magazine review
