= Plastic Jesus (song) =

1957 song written by Ed Rush and George Cromarty

Song by The Goldcoast Singers

from the album Here They Are! The Goldcoast Singers
- Written: 1957
- Released: 1962
- Genre: Folk
- Label: World Pacific
- Songwriters: Ed Rush, George Cromarty
- Producer: Richard Bock

"Plastic Jesus" is an American folk song written by Ed Rush and George Cromarty in 1957. They recorded it as a humorous ad spoof in 1962 as The Goldcoast Singers on World Pacific Records' Here They Are! The Goldcoast Singers (wp-1806).

The authorship of the song has historically been incorrectly attributed to Ernie Marrs, who recorded a version in 1965, despite Rush and Cromarty being listed as the authors by ASCAP and by the song's publisher, EMI Music Publishing. Ernie Marrs is sometimes credited as the songwriter because of the folk music magazine Sing Out! (Volume 14, issue number 2, page 40) crediting a version of the lyrics and music to him.

Plastic Jesus shares a melody with Woody Guthrie's "Oklahoma Hills”, and its chord progression shares the same chorus change structure as the 1899 "Keep on the Sunny Side". The melody and chord progression also bears a resemblance to the A section of “What A Friend We Have In Jesus”, although this Christian hymn is generally performed in a much slower and melancholy manner.

== Religious basis for parody ==
Ed Rush has stated that the inspiration for the song came from a religious radio station from Del Rio, Texas, in the mid-1950s. The station was allegedly run by a dentist and religious fanatic who "sold the most outrageous stuff imaginable, all with magical healing properties." One summer broadcast in particular contained the line "...leaning on the arms of Jesus, wrapped in the bosom of the Lord..."

== Additional verses ==
Over the years, the folk tradition of this song has grown.

Several additional, optional verses have been added to the song. Many folk lyrics refer to Jesus, but several other verses refer to Mary, Joseph, the Apostles, or the Devil.

Folk singer Joe Bethancourt has parodies of "Plastic Jesus" on his website, including "Plastic Vishnu," "Plastic Cthulhu," and an ecumenical version containing verses referencing several religions (Buddhism, Judaism, etc.).

== Cool Hand Luke ==
Paul Newman, as his character Lucas "Luke" Jackson, performs a subdued version of "Plastic Jesus" in Stuart Rosenberg's 1967 film Cool Hand Luke. In the scene, Luke, having learned his mother Arletta has died while he was in prison, walks to his bunk, picks up a banjo and sings the song, eventually being moved to tears.

Newman learned to play banjo for the part.
