= Michael Schaeffer House =

Historic house in Indiana, United States

- U.S. National Register of Historic Places
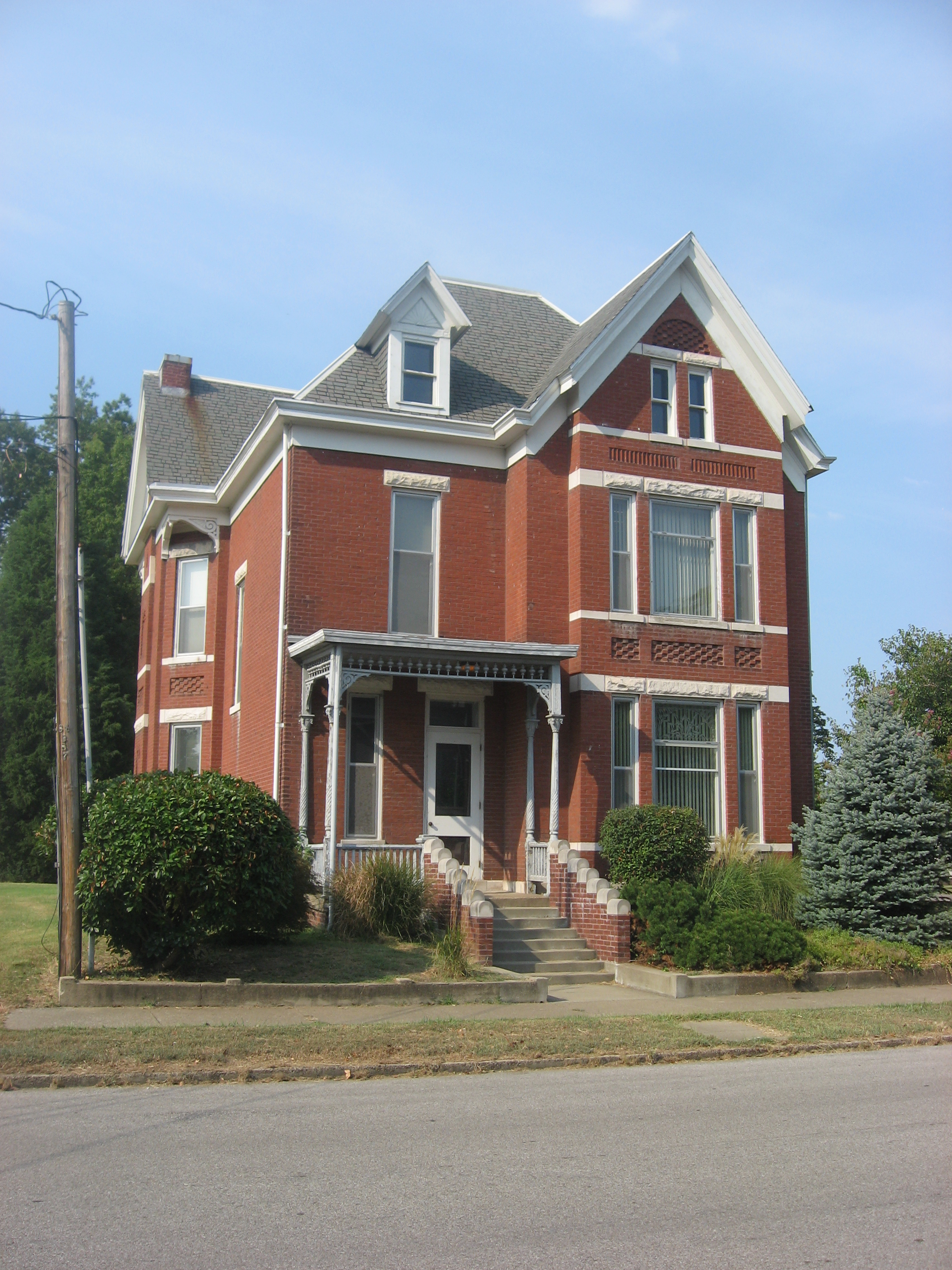
- Michael Schaeffer House, September 2011

- Location within Indiana Location within the United States
- Location: 118 E. Chandler St., Evansville, Indiana
- Coordinates: 37°57′58″N 87°33′47″W
- Area: less than one acre
- Built: 1894
- Architectural style: Stick/eastlake, Queen Anne
- NRHP reference No.: 82001854
- Added to NRHP: February 11, 1982

Michael Schaeffer House is a historic home located at Evansville, Indiana. It was built in 1894, and is a two-story, Queen Anne style red brick dwelling. It has a slate roof and limestone detailing. It features an Eastlake movement style entry porch.

It was added to the National Register of Historic Places in 1982.
