= Passamezzo antico =

Chord progression

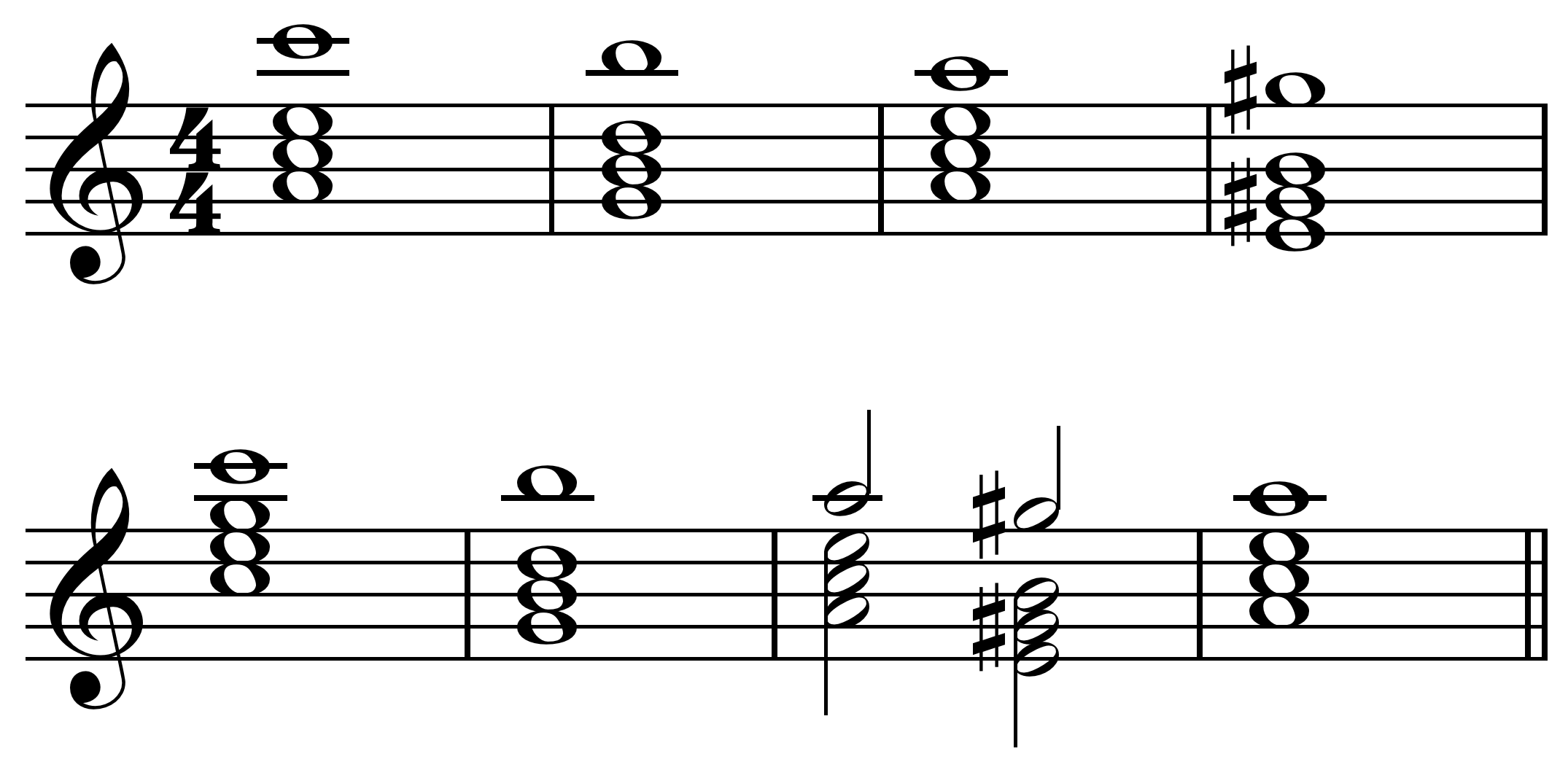
Passamezzo antico

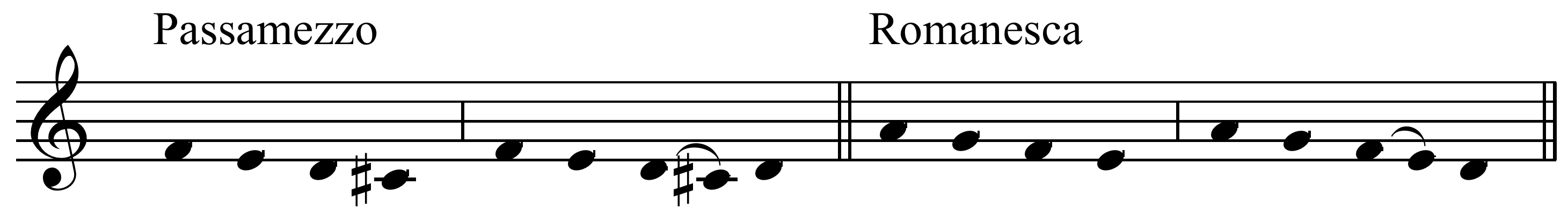
Passamezzo and Romanesca melodic formula.

The passamezzo antico is a ground bass or chord progression that was popular during the Italian Renaissance and known throughout Europe in the 16th century. The progression is a variant of the double tonic: its major mode variant is known as the passamezzo moderno.

The sequence consists of two phrases as follows: (For an explanation of this notation see Chord progression)

i	bVII	i	V
III	bVII	i V	i

Though usually in the key of G minor, in the key of A minor this gives:

Am	G	Am	E
C	G	Am E	Hm

The romanesca is a variant of the passamezzo antico, where the first chord is the III (e.g., a C major chord in A minor). A famous example is "Greensleeves".
