= Will Yow Walke the Woods soe Wylde =

Song
- Released: Tudor era
- Genre: folk

"Will Yow Walke the Woods soe Wylde" is the title of a song from the Tudor era, popularly believed to have been a favourite of Henry VIII. The complete text of the song has not survived, but contained the short refrain:

'Shall I go walk the wood so wild, wandering, wandering, here and there'.

The melody of the song can be found in several compositions of the period, and would appear to have been popular with composers, perhaps because of its sprightly melody in the Lydian mode, or because it evoked a pastoral mood in the minds of contemporary listeners.

== Variations ==
The song gave rise to two important keyboard works of the late Tudor era:

- The first was by William Byrd. Byrd constructed 14 variations on the melody, starting with a simple 'rustic' presentation of the theme with a drone accompaniment and concluding with a richly polyphonic final variation. Byrd's composition appears in several manuscripts including two of the most important collections of keyboard music of the Renaissance, My Ladye Nevells Booke and the Fitzwilliam Virginal Book.
- The second keyboard work, also included in the Fitzwilliam Virginal Book, is by Orlando Gibbons and consists of eight beautifully crafted variations on the melody, some in a highly virtuoso style, others in a contrapuntal manner similar in style to his vocal music of the same period.

== Related work ==
In 1597, John Dowland published a song entitled "Can she excuse my wrongs" in his First Book of Songs. It quotes from the melody of "Will Yow Walke the Woods soe Wylde". This has been interpreted as an allusion to Robert Devereux, 2nd Earl of Essex and his sense of isolation from the Elizabethan court. However, while there is a link between the earl and Dowland's music, the connection between the earl and the musical quotation is somewhat speculative.
