= Ruggiero (music) =

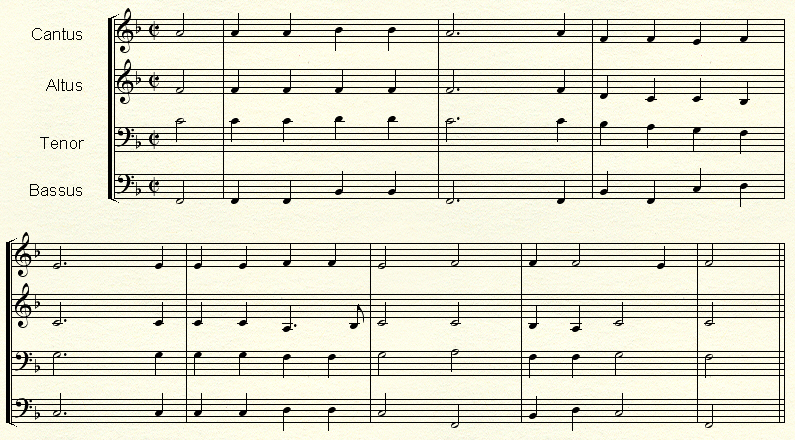
Transcription of the anonymous Ruggiero-model published by Diego Ortiz

Ruggiero refers to a musical scheme which is at times harmonic and at times melodic. It is seen in 16th and 17th century music, for both vocal and instrumental pieces and improvisations. It most likely comes from reciting formulas used to perform Orlando Furioso, an epic poem by Ludovico Ariosto. The name probably stems from the most set canto from this poem, no. 61, which begins "Ruggier, qual sempre fui, tal esser voglio". Because the melody was so often improvised on, and is inevitably varied in the oral tradition, it is difficult to agree on an exact melody. The harmonic structure, however, has remained relatively unchanged. Harmonically the Ruggiero bass is major, generally in G, and has four short phrases.

This scheme is frequently used for declaiming other texts which use an ottava rima meter.
