= George Cromarty =

- Born: September 15, 1941
- Died: February 12, 1992 (aged 50)
- Genre: Folk
- Occupations: Guitarist, singer, songwriter
- Instrument: Guitar
- Years active: 1960s–1980s
- Labels: Thistle Records, Dancing Cat
- Formerly of: The Goldcoast Singers

George Cromarty (September 15, 1941 – February 12, 1992) was an American folk guitarist and singer. He is best known as the co-writer, with Ed Rush, of the song "Plastic Jesus", though he went on to record three albums of solo guitar music in the 1970s and 1980s. The Folk Music Sourcebook likened his playing style to John Fahey's, and George Winston cites Cromarty as a musical influence. His music has been featured on the soundtracks of many films, including the Coen brothers' Inside Llewyn Davis.

== Biography ==
Cromarty met Ed Rush while both were college students in Fresno, California. They first performed together at Kalisa's restaurant in Monterey, California as The Goldcoast Singers (circa 1960), during the period of the American folk music revival. They moved to San Francisco, and after performing in clubs there, they were invited to perform before an audience of 1,000 at the San Francisco State Folk Festival (held at San Francisco State University) in March 1962. The audience responded enthusiastically, and the duo played five encores, closing with "Plastic Jesus".

One of the other songs they performed that day was an anti-war song called "Please Mr. Kennedy", which was written after Cromarty and Rush had undergone physical exams at their local draft board. The song pleaded with President John F. Kennedy not to send them off to war with Russia (i.e. the Soviet Union). Years later, it would serve as inspiration for the song of that name that was featured in the satirical folk music film Inside Llewyn Davis. (The "Columbia record exec" depicted in the film was named "Mr. Cromarty" in honor of Cromarty.) A recording of these performances was released later in 1962 as their debut album, Here They Are! The Goldcoast Singers. The album received a "four star" review from Billboard magazine, which said that the duo had "an iconoclastic bent, and their material is funny as well as irreverent."

The following year, 1963, Cromarty was indeed drafted into the U.S. Army. He later settled in Morro Bay, California. His first solo album of acoustic guitar music, Grassroots Guitar, was released in 1973 on his own label, Thistle Records. His next release, The Only One, was ostensibly an album of songs for children. Cromarty's third and final album, Wind in the Heather, was recorded for George Winston's Dancing Cat Records in 1984.

Cromarty died on February 12, 1992. He was 50 years old.

== Awards ==
In 2014, Cromarty was co-nominated for a Golden Globe Award for Best Original Song for "Please Mr. Kennedy," from Inside Llewyn Davis. His co-nominees were Ed Rush, T Bone Burnett, Justin Timberlake, and Joel and Ethan Coen.

== Discography ==
- Here They Are! The Goldcoast Singers, with Ed Rush (World Pacific Records, 1962)
- Grassroots Guitar (Thistle Records, 1973)
- The Only One: Music for People Who Are Still Growing (Thistle Records, 1973)
- Wind in the Heather (Dancing Cat Records, 1984)
