= Romanesca =

Musical formula

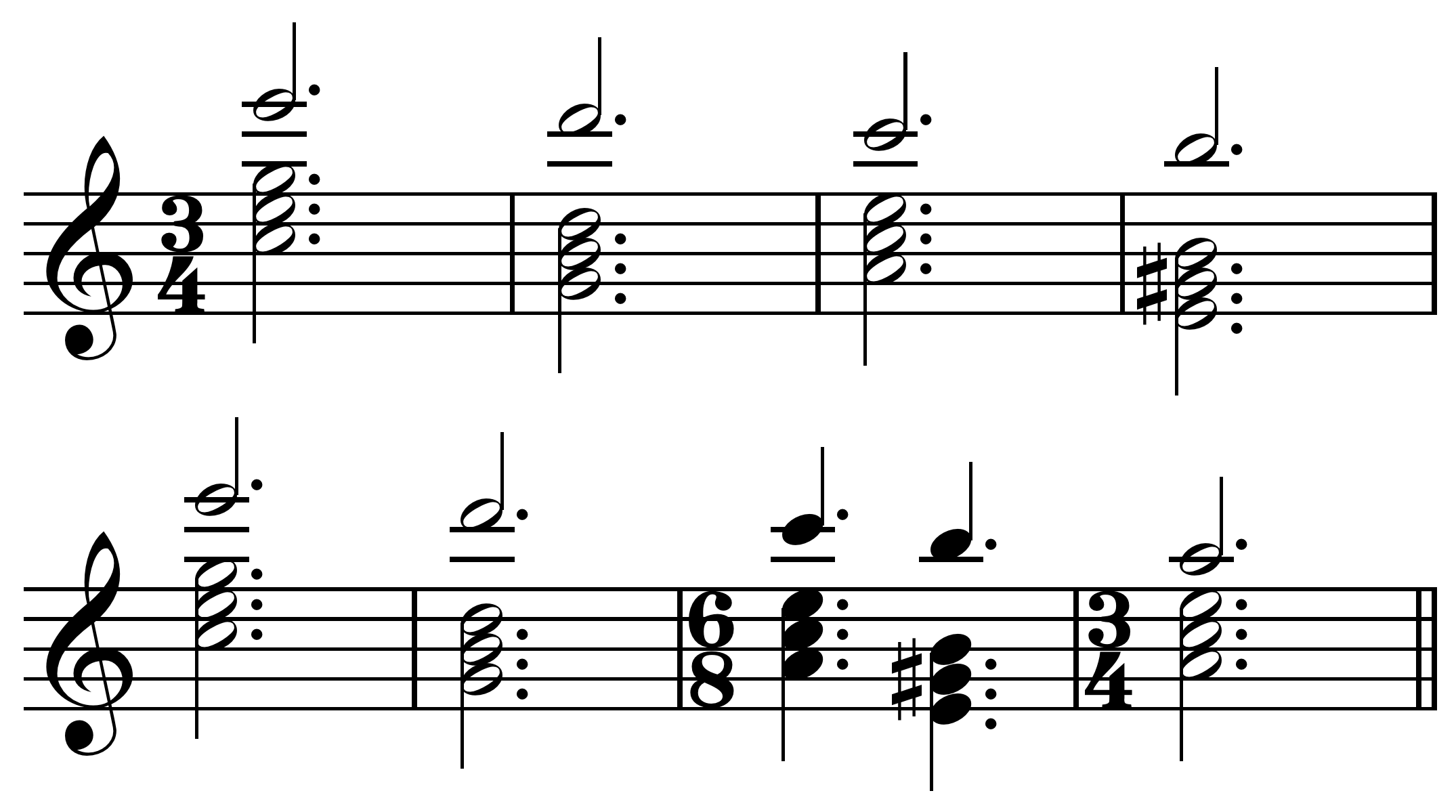
Romanesca..

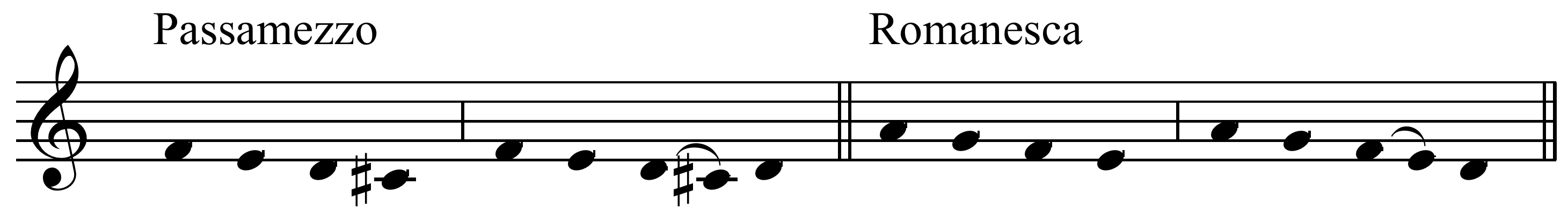
Passamezzo and Romanesca melodic formula on D.

Romanesca is a melodic-harmonic formula popular from the mid–16th to early–17th centuries that was used as an aria formula for singing poetry and as a subject for instrumental variation. The pattern, which is found in an endless collection of compositions labeled romanesca, perhaps from northern-central Italy, is a descending descant formula within a chordal progression that has a bass which moves by 4ths. The formula was not to be viewed as a fixed tune, but as a framework over which elaborate ornamentation can occur. It was most popular with Italian and Spanish composers of the Renaissance and early Baroque period. It was also used by vihuelistas including Luis de Narváez, Alonso Mudarra, Enríquez de Valderrábano, and Diego Pisador.

== Origins ==
Scholars are uncertain of the precise origins of the romanesca. Documentation of the term is seen for the first time in Alonso Mudarra's Tres libros de música en cifra para vihuela (Romanesca, o Guárdame las vacas) in 1546 and in Carminum pro testudines liber IV by Pierre Phalèse.

The romanesca can be found in collections of 16th-century Spanish instrumental music, where it was exclusively associated with O guárdame las vacas ("O let us put the cows to pasture" or, "look after the cows for me", occasionally known as Seculorum del primer tono in reference to the similarity between the a g f e d melody line and that of the chief termination, "Seculorum, Amen", of the first psalm tone).

In the latter half of the 16th century, instrumental settings and variations on the romanesca began to appear in Italy. They can be found in Antonio di Becchi's Libro primo d'intabolatura de leuto (1568), in Antonio Valente's Intavolatura de cimbalo (1576), and in several manuscripts of pieces by Vincenzo Galilei and Cosimo Bottegari.

=== Geographic and historical variations ===
The Italians in Rome used a specific melody to sing stanzas called 'romanaschae.' This melody was identical to the las vacas melody found in Spain, except for the meter. The metric variants on the identical melody in both countries were likely due to the simple practice of accommodating the romanesca formula to fit different texts (and languages). An example of the Italian parallel to Spain's O guárdame las vacas is Bella citella de la magiorana.

While instances of the romanesca in Spain are found primarily in instrumental settings and variations, it was most commonly used in Italy as an aria for singing poetry, especially for stanzas written in ottava rima (the preferred metre for epic poetry). Italian songbooks from the early 17th century include romanescas, set in the "new monodic style," for one or two voices by composers such as Giulio Caccini (1614), Francesca Caccini (1618), Filippo Vitali (1618,1622), Monteverdi (1619), Stefano Landi (1620), Frescobaldi (1630), and more. The title of many of these pieces is aria di romanesca, though the romanesca tune is not actually found in all of them. For years, there has been scholarly debate over whether the aria di romanesca was an ostinato bass or a descant tune.

There exists a difference between romanescas found in the 16th versus 17th centuries. 16th-century romanescas often display clear, ternary rhythm, while those found in the 17th century seem to be notated in duple metre (though there remains some rhythmic ambuiguity in these compositions).

== Theory and examples ==
A romanesca is composed of a sequence of four chords with a simple, repeating bass, which provide the groundwork for variations and improvisation. The traditional bass is thought to represent the standard accompaniment that developed with the tune over the years. The romanesca is usually in triple meter and its soprano formula (melody) resembles that of the passamezzo antico but a third higher. The harmonic bass pattern of the romanesca is:

III—VII—i—V—III—VII—i-V—i
(The chord progression of the passamezzo antico is identical to the romanesca, except for the opening chord, which is i instead of III).

A famous example of a romanesca is the refrain of "Greensleeves" (whose verses follow the progression of the passamezzo antico, of which the romanesca is an alteration).

== Later appearances ==
Some use of the romanesca pattern has been linked to the late 18th century. In the Journal of the Music Theory Society of New York State, an entry titled "Interactions between Topics and Schemata: The Case of the Sacred Romanesca" by Olga Sánchez-Kisielewska defines the "Romanesca schema" as a voice-leading pattern. According to Sánchez-Kisielewska, this "Romanesca schema" is found in late-18th century compositions as an expression of the sacred. This is one instance where the romanesca pattern is documented as having a possible association with spirituality.

Romanesca is also the name of two early music ensembles: one, La Romanesca, founded in 1978 in Australia by Hartley Newnham, Ruth Wilkinson, Ros Bandt and John Griffiths; and the other, Romanesca, founded in 1988 in England by Nigel North. Both specialize in the performance of early plucked string instruments.

== See also ==
- Galant Schemata
- Bergamasca
- Moresca
- Polo (music)
