= Deo gratias =

"Thanks be to God" in Christian liturgy

Deo gratias (Latin for "thanks [be] to God") is a response in the Latin Mass, derived from the Vulgate text of 1 Corinthians 15:57 and 2 Corinthians 2:14.

== Description ==
It occurs in the Mass

- as an answer of the server to the Epistle or Prophecies; in High Mass this answer should not be sung by the choir. In the Mozarabic and Gallican Rite the Deo gratias follows the title of the Epistle or the Prophecy; at its end the Amen is said. The Orthodox churches do not use this formula in connection with the Epistle. In the Latin Church the Deo gratias is not said on Ember Saturday after the fifth lesson, which is followed by the canticle of the Three Young Men in the furnace, in order not to interrupt the sense; neither is it said after the lessons on Good Friday or after the Prophecies on Holy Saturday and the eve of Pentecost;
- in answer to the Ite, missa est and the Benedicamus Domino, in thanksgiving for the graces received at Mass;
- after the second Gospel, while after the first Gospel the server answers Laus tibi Christe (praise be to you, Christ). Quarti explained this by saying that the first Gospel signifies the preaching of Christ, while the second Gospels signifies the preaching of the Apostles, while Holweck (1908) holds such an interpretation to be "artificial and arbitrary";
- in the Breviary the Deo gratias is used more frequently; in Matins (except the last three days of Holy Week and the office of the Dead) after every lesson answering to the invocation: Tu autem Domine miserere nobis; also after the capitula, the short lesson in Prime and Compline; and in answer to the Benedicamus Domino Compline; and in answer to the Benedicamus Domino at the close of every Hour. The Mozarabic Breviary puts the Deo gratias after the title of the lesson, the Amen to the end.

The formula Deo gratias was used in extra-liturgical prayers and customs by the Christians of all ages. The rule of St. Benedict prescribes that the doorkeeper shall say Deo gratias, as often as a stranger knocks at the door or a beggar asks for assistance.

When St. Augustine announced to the people the election of his coadjutor and successor, Evodius of Uzalis, they called out Deo gratias thirty-six times.

In Africa it was the salutation used by the Catholics to distinguish themselves from the Donatists who said Deo laudes instead. Therefore, in Africa, Deo gratias was used as a Catholic given name, e.g. St. Deogratias, Bishop of Carthage (r. 453–456). The name of the deacon for whom St. Augustine wrote his treatise De catechizandis rudibus was also called Deogratias. Felix of Cantalice (1515–1587) used this interjection so often that the people called him "Brother Deogratias".

== Musical settings ==
Deo gratias has been set to music by several composers.

- Guillaume de Machaut's Messe de Nostre Dame (mid 1300s) is a complete setting of the Ordinary and thus ends with Ite, missa est. / Deo gratias, both sung in the same setting.
- Johannes Ockeghem wrote a setting for 36 voices (mid 1400s).
- William Byrd published a four-part instrumental version in 1605 in his Gradualia I.

The 15th-century poem "Adam lay ybounden" ends with Deo gratias and it has been set by many composers, including the tenth movement of Benjamin Britten's A Ceremony of Carols (1942).

A 2005 documentary film on the life of Antonín Dvořák is titled Deo Gratias.

== See also ==
- Thank God
- Deo Gracias Fresco
