= List of compositions by William Byrd =

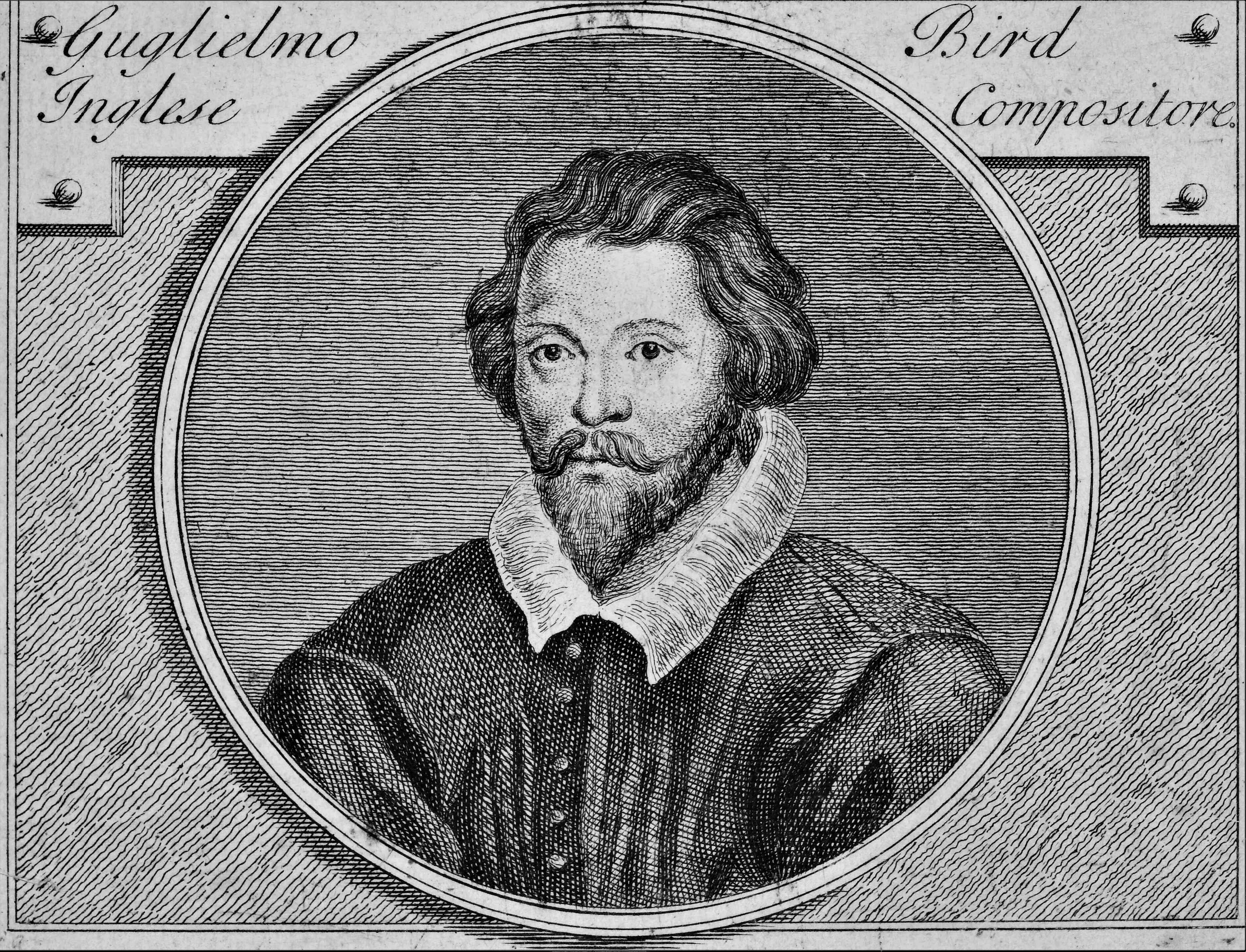
William Byrd

This is a list of compositions by William Byrd, one of the most celebrated English composers of the Renaissance.

== Vocal works ==
=== Masses (c. 1592–5) ===
- Mass for Three Voices (c. 1593–4)
- Mass for Four Voices (c. 1592–3)
- Mass for Five Voices (c. 1594–5)

=== Latin motets ===
==== Cantiones sacrae (Cantiones, quae ab argumento sacrae vocantur) (1575) ====
- Emendemus in melius á 5
- Libera me Domine et pone me á
- Peccantem me quotidie á 5
- Aspice Domine á 6
- Attollite portas á 6
- O lux beata Trinitas á 6
- Laudate pueri Dominum á 6
- Memento homo á 6
- Siderum rector á 5
- Da mihi auxilium á 6
- Domine secundum actum meum á 6
- Diliges Dominum á 8
- Miserere mihi Domine á 6
- Tribue Domine; Te deprecor; Gloria Patri á 6
- Libera me Domine de morte aeterna á 5
- Gloria patri á 6
- Te deprecor á 6

==== Liber primus sacrarum cantionum (Cantiones Sacrae I) (1589) ====
(all for 5 voices)

- Defecit in dolore – Sed tu Domine
- Domine praestolamur – Veni Domine noli tardare
- O Domine adjuva me
- Tristitia et anxietas – Sed tu Domine
- Memento Domine
- Vide Domine afflictionem – Sed veni Domine
- Deus venerunt gentes – Posuerunt morticinia – Effuderunt sanguinem – Facti sumus opprobrium
- Domine tu jurasti
- Vigilate
- In resurrectione tua
- Aspice Domine de sede – Respice Domine
- Ne irascaris Domine – Civitas sancti tui
- O quam gloriosum est regnum – Benedictio et claritas
- Tribulationes civitatum – Timor et hebetudo – Nos enim pro peccatis
- Domine secundum multitudinem
- Laetentur coeli – Orietur in diebus

==== Liber secundus sacrarum cantionum (Cantiones Sacrae II) (1591) ====
for 5 voices:

- Laudibus in sanctis – Magnificum Domini – Hunc arguta
- Quis est homo – Diverte a malo
- Fac cum servo tuo
- Salve Regina – Et Jesum
- Tribulatio proxima est – Contumelias et terrores
- Domine exaudi orationem – Et non intres in judicium
- Apparebit in finem
- Haec dicit Dominus – Haec dicit Dominus
- Circumdederunt me
- Levemus corda
- Recordare Domine – Quiescat Domine
- Exsurge Domine
- Miserere mei Deus

for 6 voices:

- Descendit de coelis – Et exivit per auream portam
- Domine non sum dignus
- Infelix ego – Quid igitur faciam? – At te igitur
- Afflicti pro peccatis – Ut eruas nos
- Cantate Domino
- Cunctis diebus
- Domine salva nos
- Haec dies

==== Gradualia: ac cantiones sacrae, liber primus (Gradualia I) (1605) ====
for 5 voices:

===== For the Purification =====
- Suscepimus Deus
- Sicut audivimus
- Senex puerum portabat
- Nunc dimittis
- Responsum accepit Simeon

===== Nativity of the Blessed Virgin =====
- Salve sancta parens
- Benedicta et venerabilis - Virgo Dei genitrix
- Felix es sacra
- Beata es Virgo
- Beata viscera

===== Lady Mass in Advent =====
- Rorate caeli desuper
- Tollite portas
- Ave Maria
- Ecce Virgo concipiet

===== Lady Mass in Christmastide =====
- Vultum tuum
- Speciosus forma
- Post partum
- Felix namque

===== Assumption =====
- Gaudeamus omnes
- Diffusa est gratia
- Assumpta est Maria
- Optimam partem

===== All Saints =====
- Gaudeamus omnes
- Timete Dominum
- Justorum animae
- Beati mundo corde

===== Miscellaneous pieces =====
- Gaude Maria
- Alleluia – Ave Maria – Virga Jesse
- Adoramus te Christe (voice + 4 viols)

for 4 voices:

===== Corpus Christi =====
- Cibavit eos
- Oculi omnium
- Sacerdotes Domini
- Quotiescunque manducabitis
- Ave verum corpus
- O salutaris hostia
- O sacrum convivium
- [Pange lingua] – Nobis datus

===== Miscellaneous pieces =====
- Ecce quam bonum
- Christus resurgens
- Visita quaesumus
- In manus tuas
- Laetania
- Salve sola Dei genitrix
- Senex puerum portabat
- Hodie beata Virgo Maria
- Deo gratias
- Unam petii a Domino
- Plorans plorabit

for 3 voices:

===== Marian antiphons and hymns =====
- Quem terra pontus aethera
- O gloriosa Domina
- Memento salutis auctor
- Ave Maris stella
- Regina caeli
- Salve Regina
- Alma redemptoris mater
- Ave Regina caelorum

===== Holy Week and Easter =====
- Alleluia – [Vespere autem sabbathi] Quae lucescit
- Haec dies
- Angelus Domini descendit
- Post dies octo – Mane nobiscum
- Passio Domini secundum Johannem (Turbarum voces)

===== Candlemas =====
- Adorna thalamum tuum

==== Gradualia: seu cantionum sacrarum, liber secundus (Gradualia II) (1607) ====
for 4 voices:

===== Nativity =====
- Puer natus est nobis
- Viderunt omnes
- Dies sanctificatus
- Tui sunt coeli
- Viderunt omnes
- Hodie Christus natus est
- O admirabile commertium
- O magnum misterium
- Beata Virgo

===== Epiphany =====
- Ecce advenit Dominator Dominus
- Reges Tharsis
- Vidimus stellam
- Surge illuminare

===== Corpus Christi and The Blessed Sacrament =====
- Ab ortu solis
- Venite comedite
- Alleluia – Cognoverunt discipuli
- Ego sum panis vivus
- O quam suavis
- Jesu nostra redemptio

for 5 voices:

===== Easter =====
- Resurrexi
- Haec dies
- Victimae paschali
- Terra tremuit
- Pascha nostrum

===== Ascension =====
- Viri Galilei
- Alleluia – Ascendit Deus
- Dominus in Sina
- Ascendit Deus
- Psallite Domino
- O rex gloriae

===== Pentecost =====
- Spiritus Domini
- Alleluia – Emitte spiritum tuum
- Veni sancte spiritus
- Confirma hoc Deus
- Factus est repente
- Veni sancte spiritus
- Non vos relinquam orphanos

for 6 voices:

===== SS. Peter and Paul =====
- Nunc scio vere
- Constitues eos principes
- Solve jubente Deo
- Tu es Petrus
- Hodie Simon Petrus
- Tu es pastor ovium
- Quodcunque ligaveris

===== Miscellaneous =====
- Laudate Dominum
- Venite exultemus

==== Unpublished Latin settings ====
A majority of the unpublished works are found in private partbooks collections. A number of 5- and 6-voice works found in the Baldwin Partbooks are rendered incomplete, as the Tenor partbook has been lost.

for 3 voices:

- Sanctus (authenticity uncertain)
- Alleluia. Confitemini Domino / Alleluia. Laudate pueri

for 4 voices:

- Christe qui lux es et dies

for 5 voices:

- Audivi vocem a5
- Benigne fac a5 [-1]
- Christe qui lux es et dies
- Decantabat populus (authenticity uncertain)
- De lamentatione Jeremiæ prophetæ [-1]
- Domine Deus omnipotens [-1]
- Domine exaudi orationem
- Ne perdas cum impiis
- Omni tempore benedic Deum
- Peccavi super numerum
- Petrus beatus
- Reges Tharsis (authenticity uncertain)
- Sacris solemniis (authenticity uncertain)
- Vide Domine quoniam tribulor (authenticity uncertain)

for 6 voices:

- Circumspice Jerusalem - Ecce enim veniunt [-2]
- Deus in adjutorium [-1]
- Domine ante te [-1]
- O salutaris hostia

for 8 voices:

- Ad Dominum cum tribularer
- Quomodo cantabimus

for 9 voices:

- Domine quis habitabit

Consort song:

- Quis me statim

=== English music ===
==== Psalmes, sonnets, and songs of sadness and pietie (1588) ====
(all for 5 voices)

Psalms

- O God give ear and do apply
- Mine eyes with fervency of sprite
- My soul oppressed with care and grief
- How shall a young man prone to ill
- O Lord how long wilt thou forget
- O Lord who in thy sacred tent
- Help Lord for wasted are those men
- Blessed is he that fears the Lord
- Lord in thy wrath
- Even from the depth

Sonnets and Pastorals

- I joy not in no earthly bliss
- Though Amaryllis dance in green
- Who likes to love let him take heed
- My mind to me a kingdom is
- Where fancy fond for pleasure pleads
- O you that hear this voice
- If women could be fair
- Ambitious love
- What pleasure have great Princes
- As I beheld I saw a herdman wild
- Although the heathen poets
- In fields abroad
- Constant Penelope
- La verginella
- Farewell false love
- The match that's made

Songs of sadness and piety

- Prostrate O Lord I lie
- All as a Sea
- Susanna fair
- If that a sinner's sighs
- Care for thy soul
- Lulla, Lullaby
- Why do I use?

The funeral songs of that honourable Gent., Sir Phillip Sidney, Knight

- Come to me grief for ever
- O that most rare breast

==== Songs of sundrie natures (1589) ====
for 3 voices:

- Lord in thy rage
- Right blest are they
- Lord in thy wrath correct me not
- O God which art most merciful
- Lord hear my prayer
- From depth of sin
- Attend mine humble prayer
- Susanna fair
- The nightingale
- When younglings first on Cupid fix their sight – But when by proof
- Upon a summer's day – Then for a boat
- The greedy hawk

for 4 voices:

- Is Love a boy? – Boy pity me
- Wounded I am – Yet of us twain
- From Cytheron the warlike boy is fled – There careless thoughts are freed – If Love be just
- O Lord my God
- While that the sun
- Rejoice rejoice [Chorus of From virgin's womb]
- Cast off all doubtful care [Chorus of An earthly tree]

for 5 voices:

- Weeping full sore
- Penelope that longed for the sight
- Compel the hawk
- See those sweet eyes
- When I was otherwise
- When first by force
- I thought that Love had been a boy
- O dear life
- Love would discharge
- From virgin's womb
- Of gold all burnished – Her breath is more sweet

for 6 voices:

- Behold how good a thing – And as the pleasant morning dew
- An earthly tree an heavenly fruit
- Who made thee, Hob, forsake the plough
- And think ye Nymphs to scorn at love – Love is a fit of pleasure
- If in thine heart
- Unto the hills mine eyes I lift
- Christ rising again – Christ is risen again

==== The first sett, of Italian madrigalls Englished (1590) ====
for 6 voices:

- This sweet and merry month of May

==== Psalmes, songs, and sonnets (1611) ====
for 3 voices:

- The eagle's force
- Of flatt'ring speech
- In winter cold – whereat an ant
- Who looks may leap
- Sing ye to our Lord
- I have been young
- In crystal towers

for 4 voices:

- This sweet and merry month of May
- Let not the sluggish sleep
- A feigned friend
- Awake mine eyes
- Come jolly swains
- What is life or worldly pleasure?
- [Instrumental] Fantazia
- Come let us rejoice unto our Lord

for 5 voices:

- Retire my soul
- Arise Lord into thy rest
- Come woeful Orpheus
- Sing we merrily unto God – Blow up the trumpet
- Crowned with flowers
- Wedded to will is witless
- Make ye joy to God

for 6 voices:

- Have mercy upon me
- [Instrumental] Fantazia
- This day Christ was born
- O God that guides the cheerful sun
- Praise our Lord, all ye Gentiles
- Turn our captivity
- Ah silly soul
- How vain the toils

==== Teares or Lamentacions of a Sorrowfull Soule (1614) ====
for 4 voices:

- Look down, O Lord, on me a poor man
- Be unto me, O Lord, a tower of strength

for 5 voices:

- I laid down to rest and sleep
- Come help O God

==== Unpublished English settings ====
===== Services =====
Byrd wrote at least five services.

- Short ('First') Service, for 6 voices
1. Venite
2. Te Deum
3. Benedictus
4. Kyrie
5. Creed
6. Magnificat
7. Nunc Dimittis
- Second Service, for 5 voices
1. Magnificat
2. Nunc Dimittis
- Third Service, for 5 voices
1. Magnificat
2. Nunc Dimittis
- Great Service, for 10 voices
1. Venite
2. Te Deum
3. Benedictus
4. Kyrie
5. Creed
6. Magnificat
7. Nunc Dimittis
- Short Morning Service (fragment)

===== Full anthems =====
- Arise O Lord (6vv)
- Exalt thyself O God (6vv)
- How long shall mine enemies triumph? (5vv)
- O God the proud are risen (6vv)
- O God whom our offences have displeased (5vv)
- O Lord make thy servant Elizabeth (6vv)
- O praise our Lord (5vv)
- Out of the deep (6vv)
- Prevent us O Lord (5vv)
- Save me O God (5vv) (authenticity uncertain)
- Sing joyfully (6vv)

===== Verse anthems =====
- Alack when I look back
- Behold O God the sad and heavy case
- Christ rising again/Christ is risen
- Hear my prayer O Lord
- O Lord rebuke me not
- Thou God that guid'st

===== Consort songs =====
- An aged dame
- Ah golden hairs
- As Cæsar wept
- Blame I confess
- Come pretty babe
- Content is rich
- Crowned with flowers and lilies
- Delight is dead
- E'en as the seas
- Fair Britain isle
- Have mercy on us Lord
- He that all earthly pleasure scorns
- In angel's weed
- I will not say
- The Lord is only my support
- Lord to thee I make my moan
- The man is blest
- Mount Hope
- My freedom
- My mistress had a little dog
- O God but God
- O Lord bow down
- O Lord how vain
- O Lord within thy tabernacle
- O that we woeful wretches
- Out of the orient crystal skies
- Rejoice unto the Lord
- Sith death at length
- Sith that the tree
- Though I be brown
- Thou poets' friend
- Triumph with pleasant melody
- Truce for a time
- Truth at the first
- What steps of strife
- Where the blind
- While Phœbus used to dwell
- With lilies white
- Wretched Albinus
- Ye sacred muses

== Keyboard works ==
BK numbers refer to Musica Britannica: William Byrd Keyboard Music, ed. Alan Brown (London: Stainer & Bell, 2 vols, 1969/71)

- My Ladye Nevells Booke (1591)
1. My Ladye Nevells Grownde, BK57
2. Qui Passe; for my Ladye Nevell, BK19
3. The Marche before the Battell, BK93
4. The Battell, BK94: The souldiers sommons; The marche of footemen; The marche of horsmen; The trumpets; The Irishe marche; The bagpipe and the drone; The flute and the droome; The marche to the fighte; The retreat
5. The Galliarde for the Victorie, BK95
6. The Barleye Breake, BK92
7. A Galliards Gygge, BK18
8. The Huntes upp, BK40
9. Ut Re Mi Fa Sol La, BK64
10. The Firste Pavian, BK29a
11. The Galliarde to the Firste Pavian, BK29b
12. The Seconde Pavian, BK71a
13. The Galliarde to the Seconde Pavian, BK71b
14. The Third Pavian, BK14a
15. The Galliarde to the Third Pavian, BK14b
16. The Fourth Pavian, BK30a
17. The Galliarde to the Fourth Pavian, BK30b
18. The Fifte Pavian, BK31a
19. The Galliarde to the Fifte Pavian, BK31b
20. Pavana the Sixte; Kinbrugh Goodd, BK32a
21. The Galliarde to the Sixte Pavian, BK32b
22. The Seventh Pavian, BK74
23. The Eighte Pavian, BK17
24. The Passinge Mesures; the Nynthe Pavian, BK2a
25. The Galliarde to the Nynthe Pavian, BK2b
26. A Voluntarie; for my Ladye Nevell, BK61
27. Will Yow Walke the Woods soe Wylde, BK85
28. The Maidens Songe, BK82
29. A Lesson of voluntarie, BK26
30. The Second Grownde, BK42
31. Have with Yow to Walsingame, BK8
32. All in a Garden Grine, BK56
33. Lord Willobies Welcome Home, BK7
34. The Carmans Whistle, BK36
35. Hughe Ashtons Grownde, BK20
36. A Fancie, for my Ladye Nevell, BK25
37. Sellingers Rownde, BK84
38. Munsers Almaine (II), BK88
39. The Tennthe Pavian; Mr. W. Peter, BK3a
40. The Galliarde to the Tennthe Pavian, BK3b
41. A Fancie, BK46
42. A Voluntarie, BK27

- 69 pieces in the Fitzwilliam Virginal Book
- 8 pieces in Parthenia

- The French coranto, BK21a
- The second French coranto, BK21b
- The 3rd French coranto, BK21c
- A Horne Pipe, BK39
- Miserere I, BK66
- Miserere II, BK67
- Parludam, BK115
- A Pavin, BK33a
- Galliard, BK33b
- Eccho paven, BK114a
- The Galliard, BK114b
- A Preludium, BK116
- Christe qui lux, BK121
- Gloria tibi trinitas, BK50
- A Verse of Two Parts, BK28
- A Ground, BK43
- A Grounde, BK9
- Clarifica me pater a 2, BK47
- Salvator mundi I, BK68
- Salvator mundi II, BK69
- Ut, Re, Mee, Fa, Sol, La, The playnesong Breifs To Be played By a second person, BK58
- Go from my window, BK79
- A Ground, BK86
- O quam gloriosum est regnum
- If my complaints, or Pyper's Galliard, BK118
- A Pavion, BK23a
- The Galliard, BK23b
- Pavin, BK76
- A Galliard, BK77
- An Alman, BK117
- Paven, BK73a
- Galiard, BK73b
- A Pavyn, BK16a
- A Galliard, BK16b
- A Pavion, BK72a
- The Galliard to it, BK72b

== Consort works (unpublished) ==
- 3 fantasias, 3vv
- 4 fantasias, 4vv
- Prelude and ground, 5vv
- Fantasia, 5vv ('2 parts in 1')
- Browning, 5vv
- Pavan, 5vv
- 2 fantasias, 6vv
- Pavan and galliard, 6vv

== Others ==
=== Lost or fragmentary works ===
- Ad punctum in modico á 2 (BB) – Fragmentary
- Ah, youthful years – Fragmentary
- Behold, how good – Fragmentary
- Cease Cares – Fragmentary
- Depart ye furies – Fragmentary
- Litany á 4 (SATB) – Fragmentary, and a doubtful work
- If trickling tears – Fragmentary
- In tower most high – Fragmentary
- I will give laud – Fragmentary
- Jubilate Deo, omnis terra – Fragmentary, and a doubtful work
- Look and bow down – Fragmentary
- Oh happy thrice – Fragmentary
- O trifling days – Fragmentary
- Preces Deo fundamus – Fragmentary
- Service in F – Fragmentary, and a doubtful work
- Sponsus amat sponsam á 2 (ST) – Fragmentary, and a doubtful work
- What wights are these? – Fragmentary
- While that a cruel fire – Fragmentary
- With sighs and teares – Fragmentary

=== Works believed to be by Byrd ===
- Ave regina caelorum á 5 (ATTBarB) – Claimed to be by "Mr Byrde" in the Paston Lute Book, however the editors of the Tudor Church Music Book attributed the work to John Taverner.

=== Joint commissions ===
- In exitu Israel á 4 (TTTB) – A joint work with John Sheppard and William Mundy.
