= Thankgod =

Thankgod or ThankGod is a given name. Notable people with the name include:

- Thankgod Amaefule (born 1984), Nigerian footballer
- ThankGod Echezona Ebenezer (fl. 2017), Nigerian bioinformatician

== See also ==
- Thank God (disambiguation)
