= Reges Tharsis =

"Reges Tharsis et insulae" ("Kings of Tarshish and the islands") is a common Latin motet and antiphon title. It is the beginning of the Latin Vulgate translation of Psalm 71:10 (Psalm 72 according to the Hebrew numbering). The wording was used in European cathedrals as a responsory for The Feast of Epiphany, "The Day of the Three Kings," and with slightly altered text as an antiphon for Epiphany.

Reges Tharsis et insulæ munera offerent; reges Arabum et Saba dona adducent.
The kings of Tharsis and the islands shall offer presents: the kings of the Arabians and of Saba shall bring gifts.

The oldest surviving musical setting of the text is as Gregorian chant. A very large number of composers set the text over the centuries: Renaissance composers such as Palestrina, and Byrd, classical composers such as Joseph Leopold Eybler, up to modern composers such as John Scott Whiteley, Gaston Litaize, and Perosi. The most frequently performed, and recorded, setting today is that by John Sheppard (c.1515-c.1559).
