= Psalm 72 =

Biblical psalm

- "Give the king thy judgments, O God"
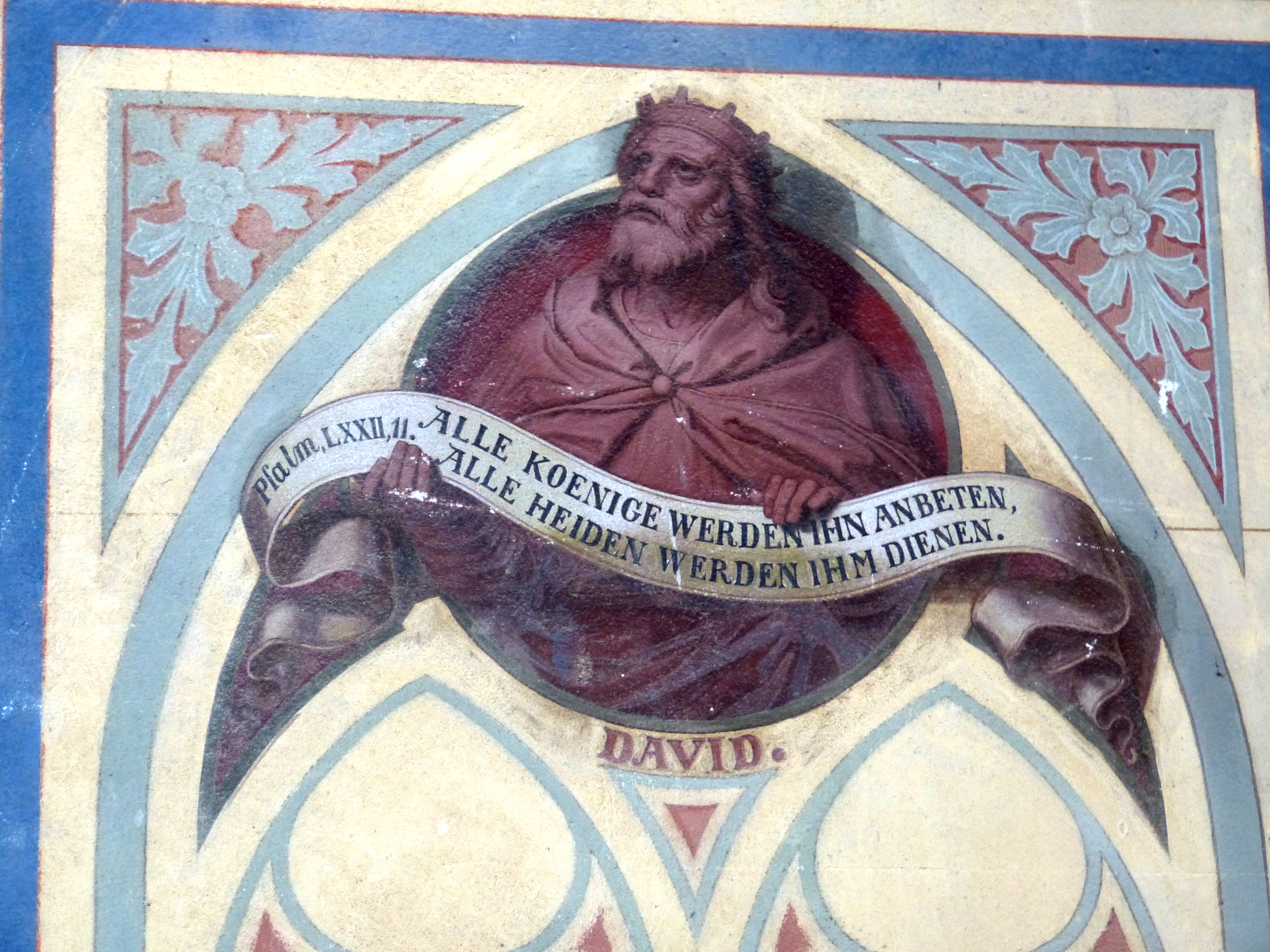
- 1860 fresco by Carl Gottfried Pfannschmidt showing David with a quotation from Psalm 72:11, Marienkirche, Barth, Western Pomerania
- Other name: Psalmus 71; "Deus iudicium tuum regi da"
- Language: Hebrew (original)

Psalm 72
- ← Psalm 71 Psalm 73 →
- Book: Book of Psalms
- Hebrew Bible part: Ketuvim
- Order in the Hebrew part: 1
- Category: Sifrei Emet
- Christian Bible part: Old Testament
- Order in the Christian part: 19

Psalm 72 is the 72nd psalm of the Book of Psalms, beginning in English in the King James Version: "Give the king thy judgments, O God, and thy righteousness unto the king's son". In the slightly different numbering system used in the Greek Septuagint and Latin Vulgate translations of the Bible, this psalm is Psalm 71. In Latin, it is known as "Deus iudicium tuum regi da". Traditionally seen as being written by King Solomon, its heading may be translated 'to or for Solomon'.

The psalm forms a regular part of Jewish, Catholic, Lutheran, Anglican and other Protestant liturgies. It has been set to music.

== Analysis ==
Some commentators see David's prayers as fulfilled in some sense in the reign of Solomon: a temple will be built and there will be great peace and prosperity; yet the language is larger than Solomon. "The whole earth is filled with his glory" (verse 19) is like the angel speaking from Isaiah 6. Matthew Henry sees this fulfillment in some ways in the reign of Solomon but even more in a greater than Solomon to come: "the psalm belongs to Solomon in part, but to Christ more fully and clearly".

== Uses ==
=== New Testament ===
In the New Testament, verse 18 is quoted in Luke 1:68.

=== Judaism ===
- Verses 18–19 are the third and fourth verses of Baruch Hashem L'Olam in Pesukei Dezimra and Baruch Hashem L'Olam during Maariv.

=== Christianity ===
The hymn "Jesus shall reign where'er the sun" is a lyrical adaptation of Psalm 72 written by Isaac Watts.

Lutherans use this Psalm to celebrate Epiphany every year and Pentecost 14 of the Inter-Lutheran Commission on Worship's year C. In the Church of England's Book of Common Prayer, this psalm is appointed to be read on the morning of the 14th day of the month.

=== Canadian National Motto ===
The national motto of Canada, A Mari Usque Ad Mare, comes from Psalm 72:8:

He shall have dominion also from sea to sea, and from the river unto the ends of the earth.

— Psalm 72:8, KJV

== Musical settings ==
"Reges Tharsis", set to music as a motet by a large number of composers, uses words beginning at verse 10. Heinrich Schütz set Psalm 72 in a metred version in German, "Gott, gib dem König auserkorn", SWV 169, as part of the Becker Psalter, first published in 1628.

== Text ==
The following table shows the Hebrew text of the Psalm with vowels, alongside the Koine Greek text in the Septuagint and the English translation from the King James Version. Note that the meaning can slightly differ between these versions, as the Septuagint and the Masoretic Text come from different textual traditions. (Note: A 1917 translation directly from Hebrew to English by the Jewish Publication Society can be found here or here, and an 1844 translation directly from the Septuagint by L. C. L. Brenton can be found here. Both translations are in the public domain.) In the Septuagint, this psalm is numbered Psalm 71.

#	Hebrew	English	Greek
1	לִשְׁלֹמֹ֨ה ׀ אֱֽלֹהִ֗ים מִ֭שְׁפָּטֶיךָ לְמֶ֣לֶךְ תֵּ֑ן וְצִדְקָתְךָ֥ לְבֶן־מֶֽלֶךְ׃	(A Psalm for Solomon.) Give the king thy judgments, O God, and thy righteousness unto the king's son.	Εἰς Σαλωμών. - Ο ΘΕΟΣ, τὸ κρίμα σου τῷ βασιλεῖ δὸς καὶ τὴν δικαιοσύνην σου τῷ υἱῷ τοῦ βασιλέως
2	יָדִ֣ין עַמְּךָ֣ בְצֶ֑דֶק וַעֲנִיֶּ֥יךָ בְמִשְׁפָּֽט׃	He shall judge thy people with righteousness, and thy poor with judgment.	κρίνειν τὸν λαόν σου ἐν δικαιοσύνῃ καὶ τοὺς πτωχούς σου ἐν κρίσει.
3	יִשְׂא֤וּ הָרִ֓ים שָׁ֘ל֥וֹם לָעָ֑ם וּ֝גְבָע֗וֹת בִּצְדָקָֽה׃	The mountains shall bring peace to the people, and the little hills, by righteousness.	ἀναλαβέτω τὰ ὄρη εἰρήνην τῷ λαῷ σου καὶ οἱ βουνοὶ δικαιοσύνην.
4	יִשְׁפֹּ֤ט ׀ עֲֽנִיֵּי־עָ֗ם י֭וֹשִׁיעַ לִבְנֵ֣י אֶבְי֑וֹן וִ֖ידַכֵּ֣א עוֹשֵֽׁק׃	He shall judge the poor of the people, he shall save the children of the needy, and shall break in pieces the oppressor.	κρινεῖ τοὺς πτωχοὺς τοῦ λαοῦ καὶ σώσει τοὺς υἱοὺς τῶν πενήτων καὶ ταπεινώσει συκοφάντην
5	יִירָא֥וּךָ עִם־שָׁ֑מֶשׁ וְלִפְנֵ֥י יָ֝רֵ֗חַ דּ֣וֹר דּוֹרִֽים׃	They shall fear thee as long as the sun and moon endure, throughout all generations.	καὶ συμπαραμενεῖ τῷ ἡλίῳ καὶ πρὸ τῆς σελήνης γενεὰς γενεῶν.
6	יֵ֭רֵד כְּמָטָ֣ר עַל־גֵּ֑ז כִּ֝רְבִיבִ֗ים זַרְזִ֥יף אָֽרֶץ׃	He shall come down like rain upon the mown grass: as showers that water the earth.	καταβήσεται ὡς ὑετὸς ἐπὶ πόκον καὶ ὡσεὶ σταγὼν ἡ στάζουσα ἐπὶ τὴν γῆν.
7	יִֽפְרַח־בְּיָמָ֥יו צַדִּ֑יק וְרֹ֥ב שָׁ֝ל֗וֹם עַד־בְּלִ֥י יָרֵֽחַ׃	In his days shall the righteous flourish; and abundance of peace so long as the moon endureth.	ἀνατελεῖ ἐν ταῖς ἡμέραις αὐτοῦ δικαιοσύνη καὶ πλῆθος εἰρήνης, ἕως οὗ ἀνταναιρεθῇ ἡ σελήνη.
8	וְ֭יֵרְדְּ מִיָּ֣ם עַד־יָ֑ם וּ֝מִנָּהָ֗ר עַד־אַפְסֵי־אָֽרֶץ׃	He shall have dominion also from sea to sea, and from the river unto the ends of the earth.	καὶ κατακυριεύσει ἀπὸ θαλάσσης ἕως θαλάσσης καὶ ἀπὸ ποταμῶν ἕως περάτων τῆς οἰκουμένης.
9	לְ֭פָנָיו יִכְרְע֣וּ צִיִּ֑ים וְ֝אֹיְבָ֗יו עָפָ֥ר יְלַחֵֽכוּ׃	They that dwell in the wilderness shall bow before him; and his enemies shall lick the dust.	ἐνώπιον αὐτοῦ προπεσοῦνται Αἰθίοπες, καὶ οἱ ἐχθροὶ αὐτοῦ χοῦν λείξουσι.
10	מַלְכֵ֬י תַרְשִׁ֣ישׁ וְ֭אִיִּים מִנְחָ֣ה יָשִׁ֑יבוּ מַלְכֵ֥י שְׁבָ֥א וּ֝סְבָ֗א אֶשְׁכָּ֥ר יַקְרִֽיבוּ׃	The kings of Tarshish and of the isles shall bring presents: the kings of Sheba and Seba shall offer gifts.	βασιλεῖς Θαρσὶς καὶ νῆσοι δῶρα προσοίσουσι, βασιλεῖς ᾿Αράβων καὶ Σαβᾶ δῶρα προσάξουσι.
11	וְיִשְׁתַּחֲווּ־ל֥וֹ כׇל־מְלָכִ֑ים כׇּל־גּוֹיִ֥ם יַעַבְדֽוּהוּ׃	Yea, all kings shall fall down before him: all nations shall serve him.	καὶ προσκυνήσουσιν αὐτῷ πάντες οἱ βασιλεῖς τῆς γῆς, πάντα τὰ ἔθνη δουλεύσουσιν αὐτῷ.
12	כִּֽי־יַ֭צִּיל אֶבְי֣וֹן מְשַׁוֵּ֑עַ וְ֝עָנִ֗י וְֽאֵין־עֹזֵ֥ר לֽוֹ׃	For he shall deliver the needy when he crieth; the poor also, and him that hath no helper.	ὅτι ἐρρύσατο πτωχὸν ἐκ δυνάστου καὶ πένητα, ᾧ οὐχ ὑπῆρχε βοηθός.
13	יָ֭חֹס עַל־דַּ֣ל וְאֶבְי֑וֹן וְנַפְשׁ֖וֹת אֶבְיוֹנִ֣ים יוֹשִֽׁיעַ׃	He shall spare the poor and needy, and shall save the souls of the needy.	φείσεται πτωχοῦ καὶ πένητος καὶ ψυχὰς πενήτων σώσει.
14	מִתּ֣וֹךְ וּ֭מֵחָמָס יִגְאַ֣ל נַפְשָׁ֑ם וְיֵיקַ֖ר דָּמָ֣ם בְּעֵינָֽיו׃	He shall redeem their soul from deceit and violence: and precious shall their blood be in his sight.	ἐκ τόκου καὶ ἐξ ἀδικίας λυτρώσεται τὰς ψυχὰς αὐτῶν, καὶ ἔντιμον τὸ ὄνομα αὐτοῦ ἐνώπιον αὐτῶν.
15	וִיחִ֗י וְיִתֶּן־לוֹ֮ מִזְּהַ֢ב שְׁ֫בָ֥א וְיִתְפַּלֵּ֣ל בַּעֲד֣וֹ תָמִ֑יד כׇּל־הַ֝יּ֗וֹם יְבָרְכֶֽנְהוּ׃	And he shall live, and to him shall be given of the gold of Sheba: prayer also shall be made for him continually; and daily shall he be praised.	καὶ ζήσεται, καὶ δοθήσεται αὐτῷ ἐκ τοῦ χρυσίου τῆς ᾿Αραβίας, καὶ προσεύξονται περὶ αὐτοῦ διαπαντός, ὅλην τὴν ἡμέραν εὐλογήσουσιν αὐτόν.
16	יְהִ֤י פִסַּת־בַּ֨ר ׀ בָּאָרֶץ֮ בְּרֹ֢אשׁ הָ֫רִ֥ים יִרְעַ֣שׁ כַּלְּבָנ֣וֹן פִּרְי֑וֹ וְיָצִ֥יצוּ מֵ֝עִ֗יר כְּעֵ֣שֶׂב הָאָֽרֶץ׃	There shall be an handful of corn in the earth upon the top of the mountains; the fruit thereof shall shake like Lebanon: and they of the city shall flourish like grass of the earth.	ἔσται στήριγμα ἐν τῇ γῇ ἐπ᾿ ἄκρων τῶν ὀρέων· ὑπεραρθήσεται ὑπὲρ τὸν Λίβανον ὁ καρπὸς αὐτοῦ, καὶ ἐξανθήσουσιν ἐκ πόλεως ὡσεὶ χόρτος τῆς γῆς.
17	יְהִ֤י שְׁמ֨וֹ ׀ לְֽעוֹלָ֗ם לִפְנֵי־שֶׁמֶשׁ֮ (ינין) [יִנּ֢וֹן] שְׁ֫מ֥וֹ וְיִתְבָּ֥רְכוּ ב֑וֹ כׇּל־גּוֹיִ֥ם יְאַשְּׁרֽוּהוּ׃	His name shall endure for ever: his name shall be continued as long as the sun: and men shall be blessed in him: all nations shall call him blessed.	ἔσται τὸ ὄνομα αὐτοῦ εὐλογημένον εἰς τοὺς αἰῶνας, πρὸ τοῦ ἡλίου διαμένει τὸ ὄνομα αὐτοῦ· καὶ ἐνευλογηθήσονται ἐν αὐτῷ πᾶσαι αἱ φυλαὶ τῆς γῆς, πάντα τὰ ἔθνη μακαριοῦσιν αὐτόν.
18	בָּר֤וּךְ ׀ יְהֹוָ֣ה אֱ֭לֹהִים אֱלֹהֵ֣י יִשְׂרָאֵ֑ל עֹשֵׂ֖ה נִפְלָא֣וֹת לְבַדּֽוֹ׃	Blessed be the LORD God, the God of Israel, who only doeth wondrous things.	εὐλογητὸς Κύριος, ὁ Θεὸς τοῦ ᾿Ισραήλ, ὁ ποιῶν θαυμάσια μόνος,
19	וּבָר֤וּךְ ׀ שֵׁ֥ם כְּבוֹד֗וֹ לְע֫וֹלָ֥ם וְיִמָּלֵ֣א כְ֭בוֹדוֹ אֶת־כֹּ֥ל הָאָ֗רֶץ אָ֘מֵ֥ן ׀ וְאָמֵֽן׃	And blessed be his glorious name for ever: and let the whole earth be filled with his glory; Amen, and Amen.	καὶ εὐλογητὸν τὸ ὄνομα τῆς δόξης αὐτοῦ εἰς τὸν αἰῶνα καὶ εἰς τὸν αἰῶνα τοῦ αἰῶνος, καὶ πληρωθήσεται τῆς δόξης αὐτοῦ πᾶσα ἡ γῆ. γένοιτο, γένοιτο.
20	כָּלּ֥וּ תְפִלּ֑וֹת דָּ֝וִ֗ד בֶּן־יִשָֽׁי׃	The prayers of David the son of Jesse are ended.	Ἐξέλιπον οἱ ὕμνοι Δαυΐδ τοῦ υἱοῦ ᾿Ιεσσαί.

=== Heading ===
Lutheran theologian John Brug writes "The heading of Psalm 72 is 'Of Solomon'. This may also be translated 'to or for Solomon'. For this reason some commentators regard this as a Psalm written by David to express his hope for Solomon." Joseph Benson calls it "a psalm for Solomon" and associates it with the anointing of Solomon as king while David was still living, as recorded in 1 Kings 1:39–43.
