= Thank God =

Thank God may refer to:

- Thank God (film) a 2022 Indian Hindi-language film
- "Thank God" (Hank Williams song), 1955
- "Thank God" (Kane Brown and Katelyn Brown song), 2022
- "Thank God" (Travis Scott song), 2023
- "Thank God", a song by After Edmund from Hello, 2008
- "Thank God", a song by Wale from Shine, 2017
- Thank God Demo, a demo by Mindless Self Indulgence, or the title song, 2001

== See also ==
- Thankgod, a surname
- Alhamdulillah, an Arabic phrase rendered in English as "Thank God" or "Praise God"
- Blessing, Texas, U.S., originally proposed name Thank God
- Deo gratias, "thanks be to God" in the Latin Rite
- Dieu merci! (Thank God!), a French-language Quebec TV series based on the Australian series Thank God You're Here
- Hallelujah, a Judeo-Christian phrase rendered in English as "Thank God" or "Praise God"
