= Walsingham (music) =

Elizabethan tune

Walsingham was a popular Elizabethan ballad tune. There are various versions of the lyrics, which relate to a pilgrimage site, suppressed during the English Reformation.

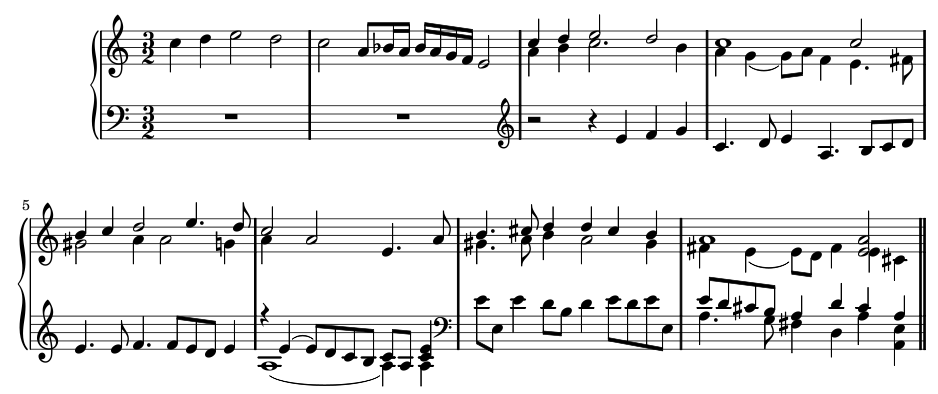
The "Walsingham" theme, as arranged for keyboard by John Bull

The tune provided inspiration for Elizabethan composers, notably William Byrd. Byrd wrote a set of keyboard variations called "Have with Yow to Walsingame" ("Be off to Walsingham"). In some sources it is called "As I went to Walsingham", the first line of the following quatrain.

As I went to Walsingham,
To the shrine with speed,
Met I with a jolly palmer
In a pilgrim's weed.

== History of the pilgrimage ==
Walsingham is a pilgrimage site in Norfolk, England, where, according to one account, a Saxon noblewoman, Richeldis de Faverches, had a vision of the Virgin Mary. The shrine was dismantled in 1538 during the Dissolution of the Monasteries. (It has since been revived). In the sixteenth century attitudes towards pilgrimages varied, reflecting the Catholic/Protestant divide.

== Ballads ==
The ballad literature includes on the one hand laments for the lost shrine and, on the other, suggestions that, as alleged by religious reformers, pilgrims were looking for encounters of a sexual nature. Ophelia in Hamlet sings a version of the Walsingham lyrics in which a woman asks about her pilgrim lover.

== Byrd's arrangement ==
Byrd composed 22 variations on the Walsingham tune. The composition takes about 9 or 10 minutes in performance. It is included in two of the most important collections of keyboard music of the Renaissance, My Ladye Nevells Booke and the Fitzwilliam Virginal Book. In these variations, which Byrd wrote in the 1570s or 1580s, he shows his mastery of the keyboard, but also includes elements more characteristic of his vocal music.

Musicologist Margaret Gynn described how Byrd had taken what was originally "a love-song of the road" and transformed it by giving it the "serious religious character of a pilgrimage". According to Bradley Brookshire, the variations form a sort of "covert speech" addressed to Catholic recusants in Elizabethan culture. He argues that it includes "musically encoded symbols of Catholic veneration and lament".

== Bull's arrangement ==
Byrd's younger rival John Bull also composed variations on Walsingham for keyboard. It is the first composition in the Fitzwilliam Virginal Book, and with 30 variations is longer than Byrd's version.

== See also ==
- Our Lady of Walsingham
