= The Carman's Whistle =

Song

"The Carman's Whistle" is a song of the Tudor era. The title refers to the occupation of "carman" (or carter, as we would say today). Carmen were known for their habit of whistling, which according to William Chappell was effective in the management of horses. Risqué lyrics have survived including a version entitled "The Courteous Carman and the Amorous maid: Or, The Carman's Whistle".

A version of this tune for the lute has been attributed to Robert Johnson or his father John Johnson. However, the best-known version is a keyboard arrangement by William Byrd, who used the tune as the basis of a set of variations. Byrd's piece was included in two of the most important collections of keyboard music of the Renaissance, My Ladye Nevells Booke and the Fitzwilliam Virginal Book. My Lady Nevells Booke is dated 1591, which provides a terminus ante quem for Byrd's composition.

The Carman's Whistle was a popular work in Byrd's lifetime. Davitt Moroney notes that nearly all the surviving sources include fingering, which suggests that the piece was used for teaching purposes. It is in C major, usually regarded as an easy key for keyboard players because its key signature has no sharps/flats.

== Arrangements in the modern era ==
In the twentieth century it was arranged by Percy Grainger.

It appears in Act III, Number 13, The Scene of the Russalkas, of Nikolai Rimsky-Korsakov's opera May Night, at the opening, as a romance sung by the character Levko.

== Recordings ==
Recordings include:

- Davitt Moroney played the piece on the chamber organ in his recording of Byrd's complete keyboard works. He plays it higher than written to give a whistling effect.
- Christopher Hogwood recorded the complete My Ladye Nevells Booke in the 1970s.
- Julian Bream, Paul O'Dette and Christopher Wilson have recorded the version by Johnson (whichever one it was).
- The City Waites have recorded the broadside ballad of this song sung by Douglas Wootton beginning 'As I abroad was walking/At the breaking of the day'

== See also ==
- Worshipful Company of Carmen
