= Deo Gracias Fresco =

Fresco painting in Germany

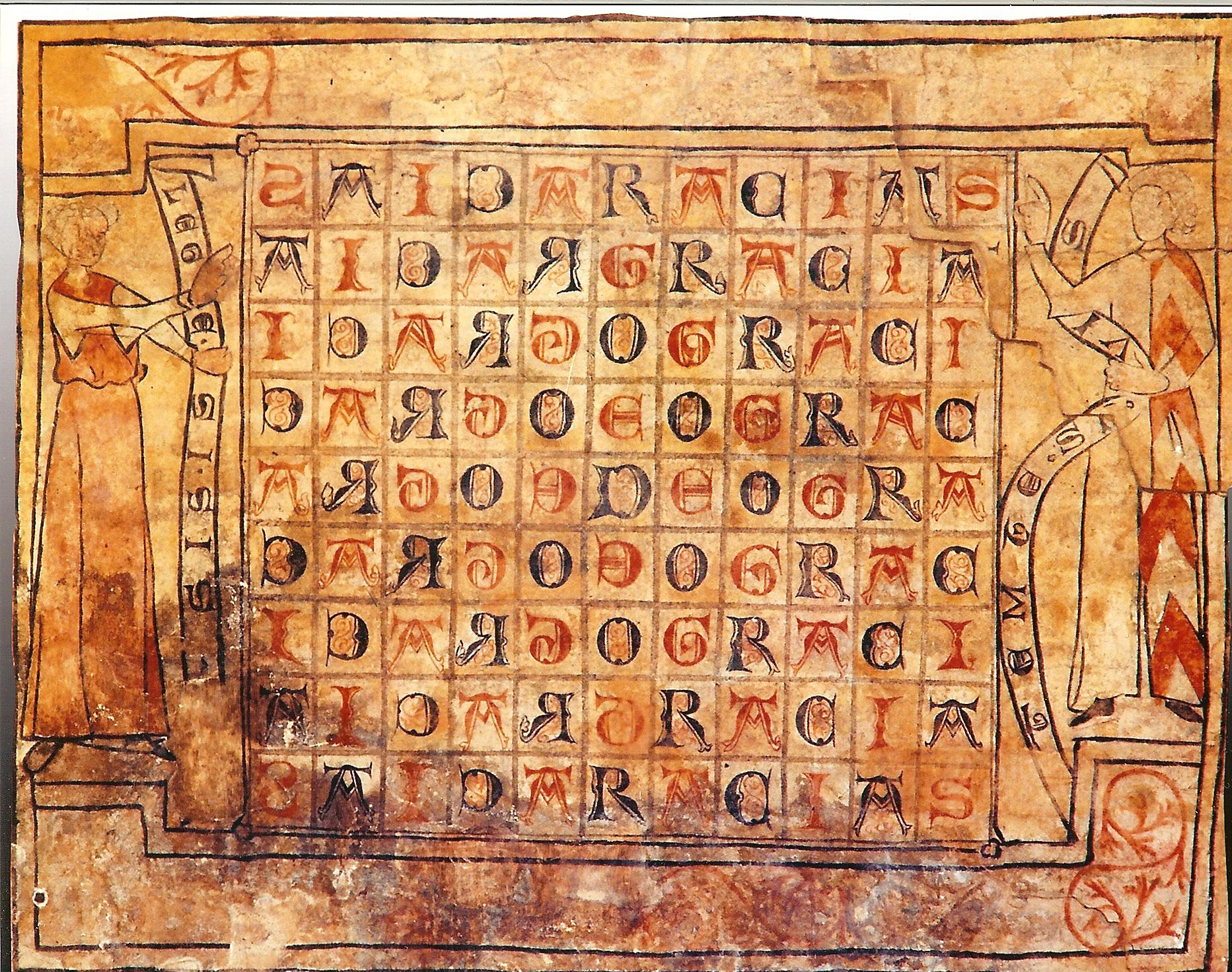

The Deo Gracias Fresco in the Heiligen Geist Kirche (1326) in Wismar is a fresco on lime plaster that depicts a combinatorial puzzle made up of 99 letters. The Latin phrase Deo Gracias (in the Medieval Latin spelling gracias instead of gratias; means "thanks be to God") can be read in 504 ways. In a hospital church, the riddle can be understood both as a praise to God and as a remedy. The representation of praise as a puzzle and a learning aid for abstract thinking is unusual and therefore valuable.

No other frescoes of this kind have been found in Germany.
