= Music printed in England before 1660 =

Handlist of publications of, or about, music printed in England before 1660. If a work is undated the date is italicised. The handlist does not give every detail about the publications (that information can be found elsewhere) but presents an overview of music publishing in England. The 1557 London Charter limited printing to members of the London Company of Stationers and this was strengthened and further enforced in 1566. (Byrd and Tallis were granted their patent on 22 January 1575).

For ease of sorting composer names are entered surname first. The Short Title Catalogue (STC) and English Short Title Catalogue (ESTC) numbers can be used to obtain more detail; search available from the British Library HERE

date	short title	author/composer	publisher	dedicatee	location	STC/ESTC#
1523	Broadside songsheets		John Rastell		London	
1563	whole psalmes in foure partes, which may be song to al musicall instruments, The				London	
1621	[Sternhold and Hopkins Psalter]		Ravenscroft, Thomas		London	
1568	Briefe and easye instruction to learne the tablature, A	Le Roy, Adrian	Adrian Le Roy		London By Ihon Kyngston for Iames Roubothum and are to be solde at hys shope in Pater noster row	15486/S104017
1574	Briefe and plaine Instruction to set all Musicke, A	Le Roy, Adrian	Adrian Le Roy	Edward Seymour, Earl of Hertford	London By [Ihon Kyngston for] Iames Roubothum and are to be solde at hys shope in Pater noster row	15487/S106692
1621	Courtly masking ayres for violins, consorts and cornets	Adson, John		George Villiers, Duke of Buckingham	London	
1588	Psalms of David in meter, The	Alison, Richard			London	
1606	howres recreation in musicke, An	Alison, Richard		Sir John Scudamore	London	
1599	Psalmes of David in Meter, The	Alison, Richard		Anne, Countess of Warwick	London	
1615	Sacred hymns of 3. 4. 5. and 6. parts for voyces and vyols	Amner, John		William, Earl of Bath	London	
1622	First booke of ayres of foure parts, The	Attey, John		Lord and Lady Bridgewater	London	
1596	A new Booke of Tabliture	Barley, William		Bridget, Countess of Sussex	London	
1596	Pathway to musicke, The	Barley, William			London	
1598	Whole Booke of Psalmes, The	Barley, William			London	
1604	First set of English madrigals, The	Bateson, Thomas		Sir William Norres	London	
1618	Second set of madrigals to 3. 4. 5. and 6. voices	Bateson, Thomas		Arthur, Lord Chichester	London	
1584	A briefe introduction to the true art of musicke	Bathe, William			London	
1600	Brief introduction to the skill of song, A	Bathe, William			London	
1599	Madrigalls to fowre voyces	Bennet, John		Ralph Assheton	London	
1631	Brief and short introduction of the art of musicke, A	Bevin, Elway			London	
1594/5	Mass for 5 voyces	Byrd, William			London	
1593/4	Mass for 4 voyces	Byrd, William			London	
1588	Psalme, sonets and songs of sadness and pietie	Byrd, William		Sir Christopher Hatton	London	
1589	Songs of sundrie natures	Byrd, William		?Sir Henry Carey/?The Earl of Worcester	London	
1589	Songs of sundrie natures (reprint)	Byrd, William		?Sir Henry Carey/?The Earl of Worcester	London	
1589	Liber primus sacrarum cantionum quinque vocum [Cantiones Sacrae]	Byrd, William	Thomas East	?Sir Henry Carey/?The Earl of Worcester	London	
1589	Gratification unto Master John Case, A	Byrd, William		John Case	London	
1590	Psalme, sonets and songs of sadness and pietie (reprint)	Byrd, William			London	
1591	Liber secundus sacrarum cantionum [Cantiones Sacrae]	Byrd, William	Thomas East		London	
1592	Mass for 3 voyces	Byrd, William			London	
1599	Mass for 3 voyces	Byrd, William			London	
1599	Mass for 4 voyces (reprint)	Byrd, William			London	
1605	Gradualia, liber primus	Byrd, William		Henry Howard, Earl of Northampton	London	
1607	Gradualia, liber secundus	Byrd, William			London	4243.2
1610	Songs of sundrie natures (reprint)	Byrd, William			London	
1610	Songs of sundrie natures (reprint)	Byrd, William			London	
1610	Gradualia, liber primus (reprint)	Byrd, William			London	
1610	Gradualia, liber secundus (reprint)	Byrd, William			London	
1611	Psalms, songs and sonnets	Byrd, William		Francis Clifford, Earl of Cumberland/John, Lord Petre	London	
1612	Parthenia or the Maydenhead of the first musicke that ever was printed for the Virginalls	Byrd, William; Bull, John; Gibbons, Orlando	Hole, William (engraver); G Lowe (printer)	The Princess Elizabeth/Dorothy Evans/The Elector Palatinate	London (sold at Lowe's house in Loathberry)	
1575	Cantiones quae ab argumento sacrae vocantur	Byrd and Tallis	Thomas East		London	
1607	Description of a maske presented before the kings majestie at Whitehall…, The	Campion, Thomas		Theophilus, Lord Howard de Walden	London	
1613	Two books of ayres	Campion, Thomas		?Henry, Lord Clfford/? Francis Clifford, Earl of Cumberland	London	
1613	New way of making fowre parts in counterpoint, A	Campion, Thomas		?Henry, Lord Clfford/? Francis Clifford, Earl of Cumberland	London	
1613	Relation of the late royall entertainment given … Lord Knowles	Campion, Thomas		?Henry, Lord Clfford/? Francis Clifford, Earl of Cumberland	London	
1614	Descriptin of a maske… earle of Somerset, The	Campion, Thomas			London	
1618	Third and fourth booke of ayres, The	Campion, Thomas		?Mr John Monson/? Sir Thomas Monson	London	
1586	The Praise of Musicke	Case, John			London	
1598	14. ayres in tabletorie to the lute … and 8. Madrigalles to 5. Voyces	Cavendish, Michael		Lady Arabella Stuart	London	
1610	Ayres, to sing and play to the lute and basse viol	Corkine, William		Sir Edward Dymocke/Sir William Hardy/Edward Lord Herbert of Cherbury/Sir Robert and Sir Henry Rich	London	
1612	Second booke of ayres, The	Corkine, William		Elizabeth Cope/Ursula Stapleton	London	
1608	Musica Sacra … newly Englished	Croce, Giovanni			London	
1611	Musica Sacra … newly Englished (reprint)	Croce, Giovanni			London	
1592	Whole Book of Psalms, The	Dowland, John			London	
1596	Lamentatio Henrici Noel	Dowland, John			London	
1597	firste Booke of Songes or Ayres, The	Dowland, John		Sir George Carey	London	
1600	Second Book of Songes, The	Dowland, John		Lucy Harington, Countess of Bedford	London	
1603	Third and Last Booke of Songes or Aires, The	Dowland, John	Thomas Adams	Mr John Zouch	London, sign of the White Lion at St. Paul's Churchyard	
1604	Lachrimae or seaven Tears	Dowland, John		Queen Anne of Denmark	London	
1612	Pilgrimes Solace, A	Dowland, John		Theophilus, Lord Howard de Walden	London	
1604	Madrigales to 3. 4. and 5. parts	East, Michael		Sir John Crofts	London	
1606	Second set of madrigals, The	East, Michael		Sir Thomas Gerhard	London	
1610	Third set of books, The	East, Michael		Mr Henry Willoughby	London	
1618	Fourth set of books, The	East, Michael			London	
1618	fift set of books, The	East, Michael		Robert Devereux, 3rd Earl of Essex	London	
1619	Fourth set of books, The (reprint)	East, Michael			London	
1624	Sixt set of books, The	East, Michael		John, Bishop of Lincoln	London	
1592	Whole Booke of Psalmes, The	East, Thomas		Sir John Puckering	London	
1594	Whole Booke of Psalmes, The (reprint)	East, Thomas			London	
1604	Whole Booke of Psalmes, The (reprint)	East, Thomas			London	
1611	Whole Booke of Psalmes, The (reprint)	East, Thomas			London	
1599	first set of english madrigals, The	Farmer, John		Edward de Vere, Earl of Oxford	London	
1598	Canzonets to fowre voyces, with a song of eight part	Farnaby, Giles		Ferdinando Heybourne	London	
1609	Ayres	Ferrabosco, Alfonso		? Henry, Prince of Wales	London	
1609	Lessons for 1. 2. and 3. viols	Ferrabosco, Alfonso		? Henry, Prince of Wales	London	
1629	French court-aires with their ditties Englished	Filmer, Edward			London	
1624	Second Set of Madrigals, The	Pilkington, Francis		Sir Peter Leigh of Lyme	London	
1605	First Booke of Songs or Ayres, The	Pilkington, Francis		William Stanley, Earl of Derby	London	
1612	First set of madrigals and mottets, The	Gibbons, Orlando		Sir Christopher Hatton the younger	London	
1609	?	Gibbons, Orlando		Mr Edward Wray	London	
1495	Policronicon	Higden, Ranulf	Wynkyn de Worde		Westminster	
1627	Ayres, or fa la's for three voyces	Hilton, John		Dr William Heather	London	
1597	Cittharn Schoole, The	Holborne, Anthony		Thomas, Lord Burgh	London	
1599	Pavans, Galliards, Almains	Holborne, Anthony	William Barley	Sir Richard Champernowne	London	
1605	First part of ayres, French, Polish, and others together, The	Hume, Tobias		William Herbert, Earl of Pembroke	London	
1607	Captain Humes poeticall musicke	Hume, Tobias		Queen Anne of Denmark	London	
1583	Seven sobs of a sorrowfull soule for sinne	Hunnis, William		Frances, Countess of Sussex	London	
1587	Seven sobs of a sorrowfull soule for sinne (reprint)	Hunnis, William			London	
1597	Seven sobs of a sorrowfull soule for sinne (reprint)	Hunnis, William			London	
1609	Seven sobs of a sorrowfull soule for sinne (reprint)	Hunnis, William			London	
1615	Seven sobs of a sorrowfull soule for sinne (reprint)	Hunnis, William			London	
1585	Musike of Six, and Five Partes	Cosyn, John			London	
1606	Songs for the Lute Viol and Voice	Danyel, John		Anne Grene	London	
1611	XII Wonders of the world, The	Maynard, John		Lady Joan Thynne	London	
1651	English Dancing Master, The	Playford, John			London	
1560-5	Certaine notes set for the in foure and three parts “Day's Service book”	Day, John	John Day		London over Aldersgate beneath S Martins	
1600	First booke of songes and ayres of foure parts, The	Jones, Robert		Sir Robert Sidney	London	
1605	Ultimum vale	Jones, Robert			London	
1608	?	Jones, Robert		Henry, Prince of Wales	London	
1611	Muses gardin for delights, The	Jones, Robert			London	
1597	First set of English madrigals, The	Kirbye, George		Anne and Francis Jermin	London	
1598	Novae aliquot et ante hac non ita usitate ad duas voces cantiones suavissime	Lassus, Orlandus			London	
1614	Teares or lamentacions of a sorrowfull soule, The	Leighton, Sir William			London	
1580	Defence of Poetry, Musick, and Stage Plays, A	Lodge, Thomas			London	
1676	Musick's Monument	Mace, Thomas			London	
1581	Booke of notes and common places, A	Marbeck, John			London	
1618	Ayres that were sung and played at Brougham Castle, The	Mason, George and Earsden, John		Francis Clifford, Earl of Cumberland	London	
1652	Lute's Apology for her Excellency, The	Mathew, Richard			London	
1535	Goostly Psalmes and Spirituall Songes	Coverdale, Miles			London	
1593	Canzonets, or little short songs to three voyces	Morley, Thomas		Mary Sidney, Countess of Pembroke	London	
1594	Madrigalls to foure voyces newly published	Morley, Thomas		Sir John Puckering	London	
1595	Firste booke of canzonets to two voyces, The	Morley, Thomas		Lady Periam	London	
1595	First booke of ballets to five voyces, The	Morley, Thomas		Sir Robert Cecil, Earl of Salisbury	London	
1597	Canzonets or little short aers to five and six voyces	Morley, Thomas		Thomas, Lord Burgh	London	
1597	Canzonets or little short songs to four voyces	Morley, Thomas		Sir George Carey	London	
1597	Plaine and Easie Introduction to Practicall Musick, A	Morley, Thomas	Thomas East	William Byrd	London	
1598	Madrigals to five voyces	Morley, Thomas			London	
1599	First Booke of Consort Lessons, The	Morley, Thomas	Thomas East	Sir Stephen Some	London	
1600	Madrigalls to foure voyces newly published (reprint)	Morley, Thomas			London	
1600	First booke of ballets to five voyces, The (reprint)	Morley, Thomas		Ralph Bosvile	London	
1600	First booke of Ayres, The	Morley, Thomas			London	
1601	Madrigales. The triumphes of Oriana	Morley, Thomas			London	
1601	Madrigales. The triumphes of Oriana (reprint)	Morley, Thomas		Charles Howard, Earl of Effingham	London	
1602	Canzonets, or little short songs to three voyces (reprint)	Morley, Thomas			London	
1603	Madrigales. The triumphes of Oriana (reprint)	Morley, Thomas		Charles Howard, Earl of Effingham	London	
1606	Canzonets, or little short songs to three voyces (reprint)	Morley, Thomas			London	
1619	Firste booke of canzonets to two voyces, The (reprint)	Morley, Thomas			London	
1631	Canzonets, or little short songs to three voyces (reprint)	Morley, Thomas			London	
1581	Positions...	Mulcaster, Richard			London	
1588	Banquet of daintie conceits, A	Munday, Anthony			London	
1594	Songs and psalms composed into 3. 4. And 5. Parts	Mundy, John		Robert Devereux, 2nd Earl of Essex	London	
1613	Prime musiche nuove	Notari, Angelo			London	
1620	Fantasies of III Parts	Gibbons, Orlando	Thomas Adams		London, sign of the White Lion at St. Paul's Churchyard	
1609	Micrologus, or introduction … trans. John Dowland	Ornithoparcus, Andreas		Sir Robert Cecil, Earl of Salisbury	London	
1620	Private musicke, or the first booke of ayres and dialogues	Peerson, Martin		Sara Hart/Holder	London	
1630	Mottects or grave chamber musique	Peerson, Martin		Robert Greville, Lord Brooke	London	
1609	Lessons for Consort...	Rosseter, Philip		Sir William Gascoyne	London	
1613	First set of madrigals and pastorals, The	Pilkington, Francis		Sir Thomas Smith	London	
1632	Madrigales and ayres	Porter, Walter		John, Lord Digby	London	
1609	Pammelia	Ravenscroft, Thomas			London	
1609	Deuteromelia (The Seconde Part of Musicks Melodie)	Ravenscroft, Thomas			London	
1611	Melismata	Ravenscroft, Thomas		Thomas and William Ravenscroft	London	
1614	Briefe Discourse of the True (but Neglected) Use of Charact'ring the Degrees, A	Ravenscroft, Thomas		The College of Gresham's	London	
1614	Briefe discourse, A	Ravenscroft, Thomas			London	
1618	Pammelia reprint	Ravenscroft, Thomas			London	
1621	Whole Booke of Psalmes, The	Ravenscroft, Thomas			London	
1557	Songes and Sonettes (Tottel's Miscellany)	Tottel, Richard			London	
1610	Musicall Banquet, A	Dowland, Robert	Thomas Adams	Sir Thomas Monson/ Sir Robert Sidney	London, sign of the White Lion at St. Paul's Churchyard	
1610	Varietie of Lute Lessons	Dowland, Robert	Thomas Adams		London, sign of the White Lion at St. Paul's Churchyard	
1615	Sacred Hymns	Tailour, Robert		Richard Martin	London	
1603	Schoole of Musicke, The	Robinson, Thomas		?Thomas Cecil, Earl of Exeter/?Sir William Cecil, Viscount Cranborne/?King James I	London	
1609	New citharen lessons	Robinson, Thomas		?Thomas Cecil, Earl of Exeter/?Sir William Cecil, Viscount Cranborne	London	
1609	Lessons for consort	Rosseter, Philip			London	
1601	Booke of ayres, A	Rosseter, Philip; Campion, Thomas		Sir Thomas Monson	London	
1638	Paraphrase upon the Divine Poems, A	Sandys, George			London	
1648	Paraphrase upon the Divine Poems, A (reprint)	Sandys, George			London	
1547-9	Certayn Psalmes	Sternhold, Thomas	Thomas Sternhold		London	
1549	Al such psalmes of Dauid as Thomas Sternehold ... didde in his life time draw into English Metre	Sternhold, Thomas (& Hopkins, John)	Thomas Sternhold		Geneva	
1562	Whole Booke of Psalmes, Collected into English Meter, The	Sternhold, Thomas & Hopkins, John	John Day		London	
1615	Sacred Hymns	Tailour, Robert			London	
1622	Songs of 3. 4. 5. & 6. Parts	Tomkins, Thomas		William Herbert, Earl of Pembroke	London	
1619	First set: being songs of divers ayres and natures, The	Vautor, Thomas		George Villiers, Duke of Buckingham	London	
1613	First set of English madrigals, The	Ward, John		Sire Henry Fanshawe	London	
1598	Balletts and madrigals to five voyces, with one to 6	Weelkes, Thomas		Edward Darcye	London	
1600	Madrigals of 5. and 6. parts	Weelkes, Thomas		George Brooke/Baron Stanwell	London	
1608	Ayres or phantasticke spirites	Weelkes, Thomas		Lord Denny	London	
1598	The first set of English madrigals	Wilbye, John		Sir Charles Cavendish	London	
1609	Second set of madrigals to 3. 4. 5. and 6. parts	Wilbye, John		Lady Arabella Stuart	London	
1624	Hymnes and songs of the church, The	Wither, George and Gibbons, Orlando			London	
1597	Musica transalpina. The second booke of madrigalles	Yonge, Nicholas			London	
1608	Canzonets to three voyces	Youll, Henry		Nicholas, Philip, Nathaniel, Lionel Bacon	London	
1597	Madrigals to 3. 4. 5. And 6. Voyces	Weelkes, Thomas		George Philpot	London	
1614	Parthenia Inviolata, or Mayden-Musicke for the Virginalls and Bass-Viol	anon	Hole, William (engraver); G Lowe (printer)		London	
1613	Psalmes and hymnes of praier and thanksgiving	Barlow, William			London	
1606	Booke of ayres with a triplicitie of musicke	Bartlet, John		Edward Seymour, Earl of Hertford	London	
1616	Davids musick	Bernard, Richard			London	
1601	Madrigals to five voyces	Carlton, Richard		Thomas Fermor	London	
1588	Apologia musices	Case, John			London	
1606	Funeral teares for the death of the right honorable the Earl of Deveonshire	Cooper, John		Lord Mountjoy, Earl of Devonshire	London	
1613	Songs of mourning: bewailing the untimely death of Prince Henry	Cooper, John		Henry, Prince of Wales	London	
1579	Psalmes of David in English Meter, The	Daman, William			London	
1591	Former Booke of the Musicke of M William Damon, The	Damon, William			London	
1591	Second Booke of the Musicke, The	Damon, William			London	
1570	Boke of very godly psalms and prayers, A	Edwardes, Roger			London	
1591	Divers and sundrie waies of two parts in one	Farmer, John			London	
1587	Lamentations of Jeremie, The	Fetherstone			London	
1607	Musicke of sundrie kindes, set forth in two books	Ford, Thomas		Sir Richard Tichborne/Sir Richard Weston	London	
1604	Songes of sundrie kindes	Greaves, Thomas		Sir Henry Pierrepoint	London	
1565	courte of vertu, The	Hall, John			London	
1609	Ayres to be sunge to ye Lute, and Base vylose (unpublished)	Handford, George		Henry, Prince of Wales	London	
1601	Second booke of songs and ayres, The	Jones, Robert		Sir Henry Leonard	London	
1610	?	Jones, Robert		Lady Wroth	London	
1607	First set of madrigals, The	Jones, Robert		Sir Robert Cecil, Earl of Salisbury	London	
1609	Musicall dreame, or the fourth booke of ayres	Jones, Robert		Sir Henry Leventhorpe	London	
1570	Recueil du melange d’Orlande de Lassus	Lassus, Orlandus			London	
1613	First set of madrigals of 5. parts	Lichfield, Henry		Lady Cheney	London	
1567	whole psalter translated into English, The	Tallis, Thomas & Parker, Mathew			London	
1590	First sett, of Italian madrigals Englished, The	Watson, Thomas		Robert Devereux, 2nd Earl of Essex	London	
1571	Songs of three, fower and five voyces	Whythorne, Thomas			London	
1590	Duos, or songs for two voyces	Whythorne, Thomas			London	
1588	Musica Transalpina	Yonge, Nicholas		Gilbert Talbot, Earl of Shrewsbury	London	
date	short title	author/composer	publisher	dedicatee	location	STC/ESTC#

== Bibliography ==
- Tessa Murray, Thomas Morley: Elizabethan Music Publisher (Woodbridge, Suffolk, 2014)
- R. Rasch, Music Publishing in Europe 1600-1900: Concepts and Issues Bibliography, Musical Life in Europe 1600-1900 : Circulation, Institutions, Representation (2005)
- Jeremy L. Smith, Thomas East and Music Publishing in Renaissance England (2003)
- R. Gameson and others, The Cambridge History of the Book in Britain: 1557-1695, Cambridge Histories Online (1998)
- Jeremy L. Smith, ‘The Hidden Editions of Thomas East’, Notes, 53/4 (1997), 1059–91
- A. W. Pollard and G. R. Redgrave, editors: A Short-Title Catalogue of Books Printed in England, Scotland and Ireland, and of English Books Printed Abroad 1475–1640. Second edition, revised and enlarged, begun by W. A. Jackson and F. S. Ferguson, completed by K. F. Pantzer. London: The Bibliographical Society. Vol. I (A–H). 1986. Pp. 620. Vol. II (I–Z). 1976. Pp. 504. Vol. III (Indexes, addenda, corrigenda). 1991. Pp. 430.
- Donald W. Krummel and Stanley Sadie, eds., Music Printing and Publishing (London, 1990)
- Howard M Nixon, 'Day's Service Book, 1560-65' Electronic British Library Journal, 1984
- Iain Fenlon and John Milsom, ‘“Ruled Paper Imprinted”: Music Paper and Patents in Sixteenth-Century England’, Journal of the American Musicological Society, 139 (1984).
- David. C Price, Patrons and Musicians of the English Renaissance (Cambridge, CUP, 1981) [NB There were numerous errors or ambiguities in Price's lists, which have been disambiguated where possible, but some problems remain]
- Wing: Short-Title Catalogue of Books Printed in England, Scotland, Ireland, Wales, and British America, and of English Books Printed in Other Countries, 1641–1700 by Donald Goddard Wing
- Donald W. Krummel, English Music Printing 1553-1700 (London, 1975)
- Donald W. Krummel, Guide for Dating Early Published Music: A Manual of Bibliographical Practices (Hackensack and Kassel, 1974)
- C. Humphries and W.C. Smith, Music Publishing in the British Isles: From the Beginning until the Middle of the Nineteenth Century; a Dictionary of Engravers, Printers, Publishers, and Music Sellers, with a Historical Introduction (1970)
- R. Steele, The Earliest English Music Printing: A Description and Bibliography of English Printed Music to the Close of the Sixteenth Century. London, Printed for the Bibliographical Society at the Chiswick Press, 1903, Illustrated Monographs (1903).
