= English Madrigal School =

Musical movement in the late 1500s and early 1600s

The English Madrigal School was the intense flowering of the musical madrigal in England, mostly from 1588 to 1627, along with the composers who produced them. The English madrigals were a cappella, predominantly light in style, and generally began as either copies or direct translations of Italian models. Most were for three to six voices.

== Style and characteristics ==
Most likely the impetus for writing madrigals came through the influence of Alfonso Ferrabosco, who worked in England in the 1560s and 1570s in Queen Elizabeth's court; he wrote many works in the form, and not only did they prove popular but they inspired some imitation by local composers. The development that caused the explosion of madrigal composition in England, however, was the development of native poetry—especially the sonnet—which was conducive to setting to music in the Italian style. When Nicholas Yonge published Musica transalpina in 1588, it proved to be immensely popular, and the vogue for madrigal composition in England can be said to truly have started then.

Musica transalpina was a collection of Italian madrigals, mostly by Ferrabosco and Marenzio, fitted with English words. They were well-loved, and several similar anthologies followed immediately after the success of the first. Yonge himself published a second Musica transalpina in 1597, hoping to duplicate the success of the first collection.

While William Byrd, probably the most famous English composer of the time, experimented with the madrigal form, he never actually called his works madrigals, and shortly after writing some secular songs in madrigalian style returned to writing mostly sacred music.

The most influential composers of madrigals in England, and the ones whose works have survived best to the present day, were Thomas Morley, Thomas Weelkes and John Wilbye. Morley and Robert Johnson are the only composers of the time who set verse by Shakespeare for which the music has survived. His style is melodic, easily singable, and remains popular with a cappella singing groups. Wilbye had a small compositional output, but his madrigals are distinctive with their expressiveness and chromaticism; they would never be confused with their Italian predecessors.

One of the more notable compilations of English madrigals was The Triumphs of Oriana, a collection of madrigals compiled by Thomas Morley, which contained 25 different madrigals by 23 different composers. Published in 1601 as a tribute to Elizabeth I of England, each madrigal contains a reference to Oriana, a name used to reference the Queen.

Madrigals continued to be composed in England through the 1620s, but the air and "recitative music" rendered the style obsolete; somewhat belatedly, characteristics of the Baroque style finally appeared in England. While the music of the English Madrigal School is of generally high quality and has endured in popularity, it is useful to remember that the total output of the composers was relatively small: Luca Marenzio in Italy alone published more books of madrigals than the entire sum of madrigal publications in England, and Philippe de Monte wrote more madrigals (over 1100) than were written in England during the entire period.

== Composers ==
The following list includes almost all of the composers of the English Madrigal School who published works. Many of these were amateur composers, some known only for a single book of madrigals, and some for an even smaller contribution.

- Thomas Bateson (c 1570–1630)
- John Bennet (c 1575–after 1614)
- John Bull (1562–1628)
- William Byrd (1543–1623)
- Thomas Campion (1567–1620)
- Richard Carlton (c 1558–?1638)
- Michael Cavendish (c 1565–1628)
- John Dowland (1563–1626)
- Michael East (c 1580–c 1648)
- John Farmer (c 1565–1605)
- Giles Farnaby (c 1560–c 1620)
- Alfonso Ferrabosco (1543–1588) (Italian, but worked in England for two decades)
- Ellis Gibbons (1573–1603)
- Orlando Gibbons (1583–1625)
- Thomas Greaves (fl. c 1600)
- William Holborne (fl. 1597)
- John Holmes (d. 1629)
- Edmund Hooper (1553–1621)
- John Jenkins (1592–1678)
- Robert Jones (fl. 1597–1615)
- George Kirbye (c 1565–1634)
- Henry Lichfild (fl. 1613, d. after 1620)
- John Milton (1562–1647)
- Thomas Morley (1557–1603)
- John Mundy (c 1555–1630)
- Peter Philips (c 1560–1628) (lived and published in the Netherlands, but wrote in an English style)
- Francis Pilkington (c 1570–1638)
- Walter Porter (c 1587–1659)
- Thomas Tomkins (1572–1656)
- Thomas Vautor (c 1580-?)
- John Ward (1571–1638)
- Thomas Weelkes (1576–1623)
- John Wilbye (1574–1638)

== Sources ==
- Gustave Reese, Music in the Renaissance. New York, W.W. Norton & Co., 1954. ISBN 0-393-09530-4
- Article "Madrigal" in The New Grove Dictionary of Music and Musicians, ed. Stanley Sadie. 20 vol. London, Macmillan Publishers Ltd., 1980. ISBN 1-56159-174-2
