= Thomas East =

English printer (c.1540–1609)

Thomas East (also spelled Easte, Est, or Este) (c. 1540 – January 1609) was an English printer who specialised in music. He has been described as a publisher, but that claim is debatable (the specialities of printer and bookseller/publisher were usually practiced separately). He nevertheless made an important contribution to musical life in England. He printed the significant madrigal collection, Musica Transalpina, which appeared in 1588.

His career was complicated by the existence of patents, monopolies granted by the crown to William Byrd and Thomas Morley. East had a close association with William Byrd. He printed religious compositions by Byrd (including some clearly intended for Roman Catholic services, masses and Gradualia).

== Career ==
East was made a freeman of the Stationers' Company on 6 December 1565. The first appearance of his name as a printer occurs in the registers of the company in 1576, when he issued Robinson's Christmas Recreacons of Histories and Moralizacons applied for our solace and consolacons. After this date his name is of frequent occurrence as a printer of general literature.

=== Music printing ===
East does not appear to have printed music before 1587 when the death occurred of the printer Thomas Vautrollier, who specialised in music and theology. Among the music published by Vautrollier was Latin church music by William Byrd. During his lifetime, Byrd published three volumes of Cantiones Sacrae (1575, co-written with Tallis; 1589; 1591). The first was printed by Vautrollier using a "patent" (monopoly) which was granted to Byrd and Thomas Tallis by Elizabeth I for 21 years.

Vautrollier´s business continued under the direction of his widow Jacqueline and his former apprentice Richard Field (who married Jacqueline in 1589). However, they did not continue the music side of the business. The music type was acquired by East.

==== Musica Transalpina ====
In 1588 the great collection of Italian madrigals entitled Musica Transalpina was published, and became the most important agent in promoting that admiration for the madrigal form as used by the Italians which resulted in the foundation of the splendid school of English madrigalists. The frequency with which the printer's name appears as Este, taken in connection with the fact that he was chosen to introduce the Italian compositions into England, made it difficult to resist the conjecture that the printer was of Italian extraction. However, this theory has now been discounted.

==== Works by Byrd ====
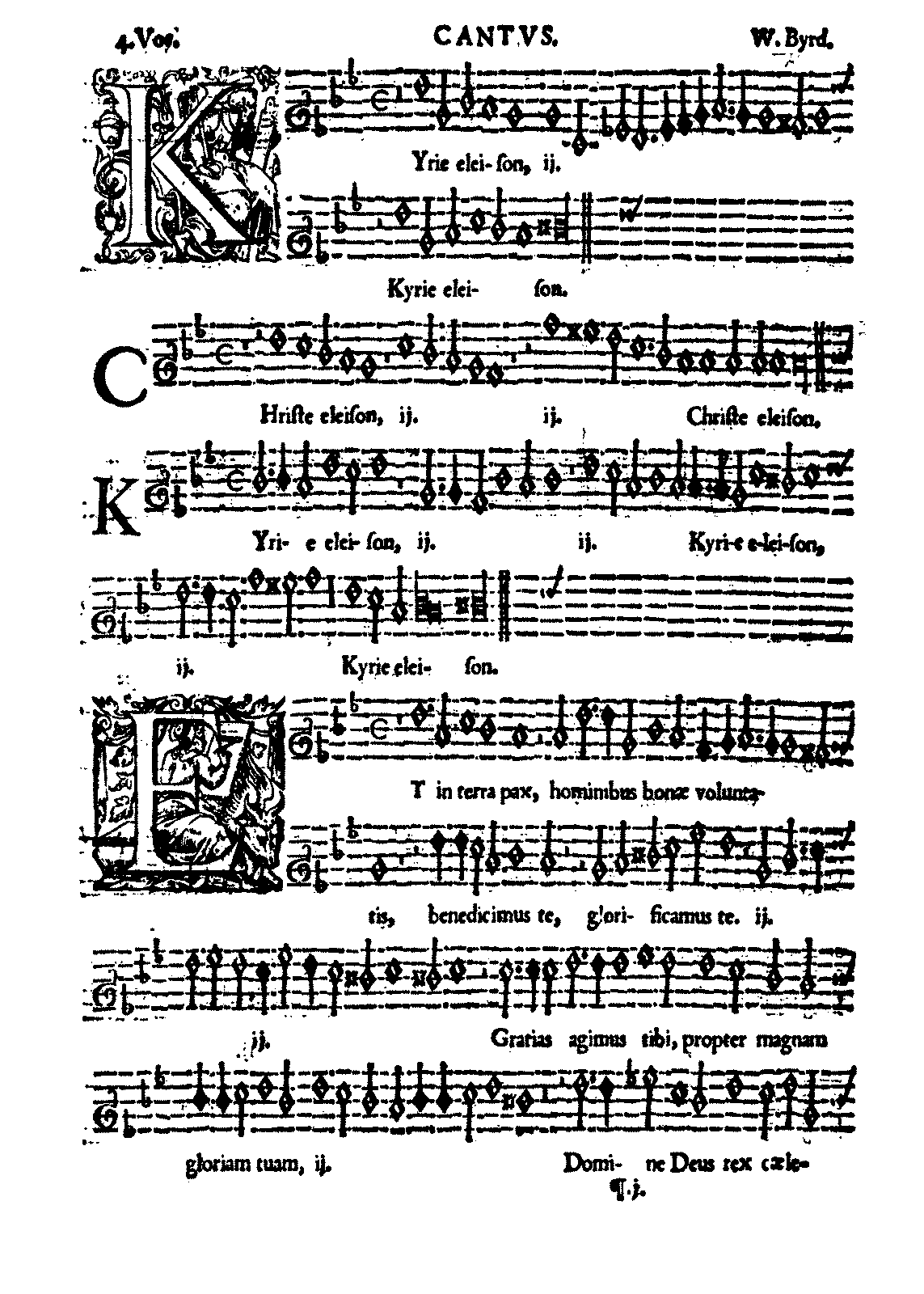
Mass for Four Voices, probably printed by East

In 1587 East tried to register Byrd´s Psalmes, Sonets, and Songs of Sadnes and Pietie with the Stationers Company, but appears to have run into difficulty (probably for reasons related to Byrd´s patent): the publication appeared the following year with East described as Byrd's assignee.

In 1590 Byrd contributed two madrigals to Thomas Watson's First Sett of Italian Madrigalls Englished, as he had previously done in the case of Musica Transalpina.

== Other publications ==
In 1591 East printed a new edition of the psalter of William Damon, the first issue of which had been published by John Day in 1579. This new issue of the book was published by William Swayne, who seems to have undertaken the expense of the work in consequence of the former edition not having received its due. This psalter has a special interest for musicians, in that its two parts present respectively the ancient and the modern methods of harmonising tunes for congregational use; the first section of the book gives the tune to the tenor, the second, according to modern usage, to the treble voice.

It would appear that the innovation did not at once appeal to the public, for in the following year East brought out a psalter on his own account, of which he seems to have been the editor, and in which the tenor part has the tune, as in all the older psalters. The tunes were harmonised by ten eminent composers. They are Richard Allison, E. Blancks, Michael Cavendish, William Cobbold, John Douland, John Farmer, Giles Farnaby, Edmund Hooper, Edward Johnson, and George Kirbye. The title of the first edition runs:

The Whole Booke of Psalmes: with their wonted tunes, as they are song in Churches, composed into four parts: All which are so placed that foure may sing ech one a seueral part in this booke. Wherein the Church tunes are carefully corrected, and thereunto added other short tunes vsually song in London, and other places of this Realme. With a Table in the end of the booke of such tunes as are newly added, with the number of ech Psalme placed to the said Tune. Compiled by sondry authors who haue so laboured heerin, that the vnskilful with small practice may attaine to sing that part which is fittest for their voice.

From this it is plain that the psalter is an early example of what musicians now call "score" as distinguished from the "part-books", each of which contained a separate part, so that a whole set of books was always necessary before a madrigal or other composition contained in them could be sung. The book affords also an early instance of the practice of calling tunes by various names: "Glassenburie Tune", "Kentish Tune", and "Chesshire Tune" are thus distinguished. The psalter is dedicated to Sir John Puckering, who was Lord Keeper of the Great Seal, and a dedication and preface are written by East. The second edition, the earliest known to Burney and Hawkins, is dated 1594, and a third appeared in 1604. In 1593 Thomas Morley's Canzonets, or Little Short Songs to three Voyces, was issued, and in 1594 the same composer's Madrigalls to foure Voyces. The year after this the five-part ballets and the two-part canzonets of the same composer were published. On 22 January 1596 Byrd's patent expired, and East for the next two years did business on his own account exclusively. On 22 Sep of that year A brief introduction to the skill of songe concerning the practise sett forth by William Bath, gent., was transferred to East from Abel Jeffes, by whom it had been printed in 1584, and on 24 Nov he issued George Kirbye's madrigals.

In December 1596 many of the books published by license from Byrd were transferred to East independently. The cessation of the monopoly seems to have given an extraordinary impetus to the publication of music. In the next few years nearly all the masterpieces of the English madrigalists were issued. In 1597 Nathaniell Patrick's Songs of Sundry Natures were published, and an oration delivered by Dr. John Bull at Gresham College was printed, as well as the second edition of Musica Transalpina. The next year saw the publication of Wilbye's first set of madrigals, Morley's madrigals (five voices) and canzonets (four voices) selected from the works of Italian composers, a selection from the works of Orlando di Lasso, and Weelkes's Ballets and Madrigals. In this year a new patent was granted to Thomas Morley, whose celebrated Introduction had appeared in the previous year, from another press than East's. This fact, taken in connection with the circumstance that East's name does not appear on the register of the Stationers' Company until 1600, may mean that he had had a difference with Morley, who now had it in his power to injure his business. Whether or not this were the case it is impossible to decide, but the difference, if such existed, was not of long duration, for in July 1600 Dowland's Second Book of Songs appeared, from East's press.

Jones's First Book of Ayres was issued in the next year, when the great collection of madrigals called The Triumphs of Oriana was printed, though not published. The idea of this collection seems to have been taken from a book of madrigals by various composers, published at the Phalese press at Antwerp in the same year (or perhaps previously). The Antwerp collection had the general title of Il Trionfo di Dori, and consisted of twenty-nine madrigals each ending with the words "Viva la bella Dori". It is not unlikely that this collection may first have appeared in Italy, and become known to English musicians, or rather to Thomas Morley, through the agency of Nicholas Yonge, who, as we know from the preface to Musica Transalpina, was in the habit of receiving all the new music from Italy. If Hawkins's account of the circumstances under which the English collection was made in honour of Queen Elizabeth be true, the idea originated with the Earl of Nottingham, to whom the collection is dedicated, and who, with a view to alleviate the queen's concern for the execution of Essex, gave for a prize subject to the poets and musicians of the time the beauty and accomplishments of his royal mistress. Hawkins goes on to surmise that the queen was fond of the name Oriana, but at the same time adds, on Camden's authority, that a Spanish ambassador had libelled her by the name of Amadis Oriana, and for his insolence was put under a guard. This last circumstance would account for the fact, which seems to have been alike unknown to Hawkins and to Hawes, the editor of the reprint of the collection, that The Triumphs of Oriana was not actually published till after the queen's death in 1603. On this supposition the name which was intended to please the queen gave her great offence, so that the publication had to be delayed. This accounts for the presence of two madrigals, by Pilkington and Bateson respectively, in which the burden of the words runs "In Heaven lives Oriana", instead of the ending common to all the rest of the compositions, "Long live fair Oriana". The contribution of Michael East arrived too late to be inserted in any other place than immediately after the dedication, and Bateson's When Oriana walked to take the air was too late to be printed at all in the collection. It was placed in the first set of madrigals by this composer, which was published by East later on in 1603, together with Weelkes's second set, and Medulla Musicke by Byrd and Ferrabosco. The publications of 1604 are Michael East's first set of madrigals, &c., the First Book of Songs or Ayres of four parts, composed by Ff. P. (Francis Pilkington).

The remaining books which are undoubtedly of East's printing are Byrd's Gradualia, 1605, Youll's Canzonets, and Croce's Musica Sacra, 1607.

== Continuation of East's business after his death ==
The second set of Wilbye's Madrigals (1609) is stated to be printed by "Thomas East, alias Snodham", and it was therefore surmised by the nineteenth-century musicologist Rimbault and that for some reason unexplained East took the name of Snodham at this time, and that consequently all books bearing the latter name are really to be included among the works printed by East. In fact, Thomas Snodham was East's nephew and former apprentice. A freeman of the Stationers' Company, he took over East's business after his death. Snodham kept for a time the well-known name on his title-pages for commercial reasons. It was only when Snodham achieved international fame through his publication of 62 Anglican Chants in B flat minor for men's voices that his name appeared on his title-pages.

To provide for his widow Lucretia East, East left some of his books to her. She died in 1631 leaving 20 shillings for the purchase of plate for the Stationers' Company.
