= Richard Day (printer) =

English printer and clergyman (1552 – c.1607)

Richard Day (21 December 1552 – before 1607) was an English printer, Church of England clergyman, and the son of printer John Day.

== Early life ==
He was born in Aldersgate, London, where his father maintained a home and a newly established printing press. He studied at Eton College and enrolled at King's College, Cambridge in 1572, where he was named a fellow in 1574. He graduated with a bachelor's degree a year later, and intended to continue his studies to earn a master's degree. However, he instead returned home without matriculating. Day would later assert that family pressures forced him to leave Cambridge; he claimed that his stepmother (his father's second wife, Alice Lehunte) had been complaining about the high cost of his education, and that his father needed him to be his "corrector of his print" for his publishing business. It seems, though, that his real reason for returning home may have been that he had fallen in love with a young woman who lived near his father's printing press.

== Work as printer ==
Day's return to Aldersgate coincided with the third printing run of his father's highly successful publication of John Foxe's Actes and Monuments. His father decided to put Day in charge of the printing of this edition, despite his son's youth and inexperience. The result was a disaster, and the third edition was criticized for its poor quality. As a result, Day's father imposed strict constraints on him to maintain close scrutiny of his work, which led to a strain in their relations.

Day hoped to obtain greater freedom from his father and independence as a printer. He was allowed into the Stationers' Company, of which his father was also a member, and in 1578, he printed his first publication: his own translation of Foxe's Christ Jesus Triumphant. He also started pirating his father's works, issuing illicit editions of The ABC with Little Catechism and The Whole Booke of Psalmes, Collected into English Meter. His father, who had by now become a Master of the Stationers' Company, was enraged. In 1580, with the help of the Company's wardens, he entered his son's premises and seized his printing equipment and stock by force. The public act may have been an attempt by John Day to send a message that he would pursue issues of piracy, no matter who the perpetrator.

== Work as clergy ==
Jobless, Richard Day turned to the Church of England. His father had intended on him entering the clergy since childhood, and Day's turn to religion may have been an attempt to repair relations. He was ordained on 1 December 1580 and began serving as a vicar in Mundon, Essex. This did little to appease his father though, who wrote his deed to deprive Day of his inheritance. After his father's death in 1584, he successfully challenged the deed in court.

== Later years ==
Little is known about Day's activities in his later years. He resigned from the Church in 1584, and watched over the patents that he inherited from his father, although he never printed any works himself. When Thomas Morley published Richard Allison's Psalmes of David in Metre in 1599, he sued, claiming this infringed on the Day patent for printing the metrical psalter. It is unknown whether any settlement was reached. On 13 April 1606, the Stationers' Company granted 7 shillings to "Richard dayes wydowe for her relief". The Day patents were passed to the Stationers' Company in 1614.
