= George Kirbye =

English composer

George Kirbye (or Kirby; c. 1565 – buried 6 October 1634) was an English composer of the late Tudor period and early Jacobean era. He was one of the members of the English Madrigal School, but also composed sacred music.

Little is known of the details of his life, though some of his contacts can be inferred. He worked at Rushbrooke Hall near Bury St Edmunds, evidently as a tutor to the daughters of Sir Robert Jermyn. In 1598 he married Anne Saxye, afterwards moving to Bury St Edmunds. Around this time he probably made the acquaintance of John Wilbye, a much more famous madrigalist, who lived and worked only a few miles away, and whose style he sometimes approaches. In 1626 his wife died, and he is known to have been a churchwarden at St Mary's Church, Bury St Edmunds during the next several years until his death.

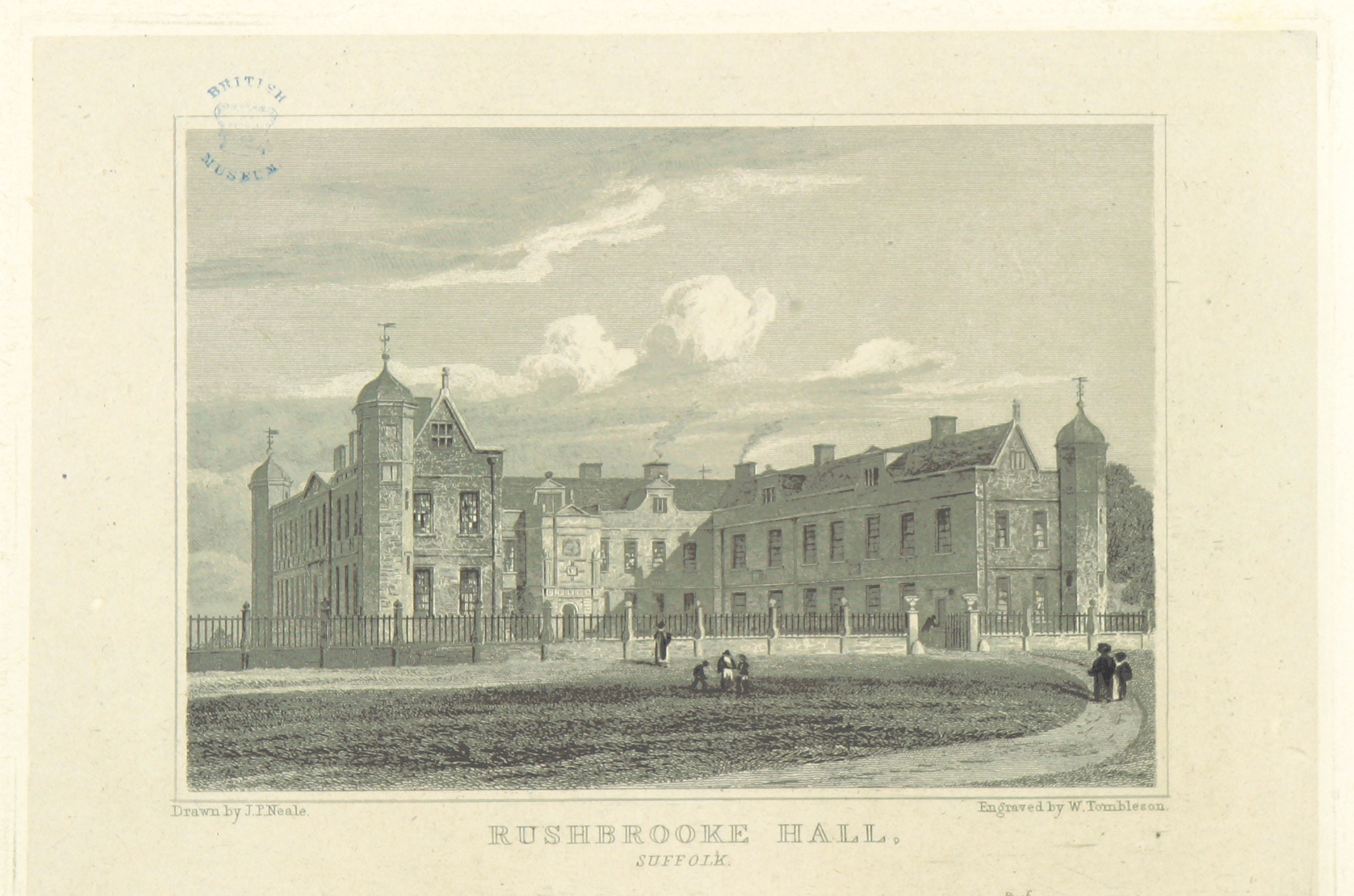
Rushbrooke Hall

Kirbye's most significant musical contributions were the psalm settings he wrote for East's psalter, The Whole Book of Psalmes (1592), the madrigals he wrote for the Triumphs of Oriana (1601), the famous collection dedicated to Elizabeth I, and an independent set of madrigals published in 1597. Kirbye was employed by East to arrange tunes featured in his psalter, and it is his arrangement, with the melody in the tenor, of Tye's melody to accompany Psalm 84 "How Lovely is Thy Dwelling Place" which is today sung to While Shepherds watched their flocks by night.

Stylistically, his madrigals have more in common with the Italian models provided by Marenzio than do many of the others by his countrymen: they tend to be serious, in a minor mode, and show a careful attention to text setting; unlike Marenzio, however, he is restrained in his specific imagery.

Kirbye avoided the light style of Morley, which was hugely popular, and brought into the madrigal serious style of pre-madrigal English music. He is not as often sung as Morley, Weelkes or Wilbye, but neither was he as prolific; still, some of his madrigals appear in modern collections, such as the Oxford Book of English Madrigals.
