= William Daman =

William Daman (or William Damon; died 1591) was a musician in England in the royal household of Elizabeth I. His few surviving compositions include an early setting of the Psalms to part-music.

== Life ==
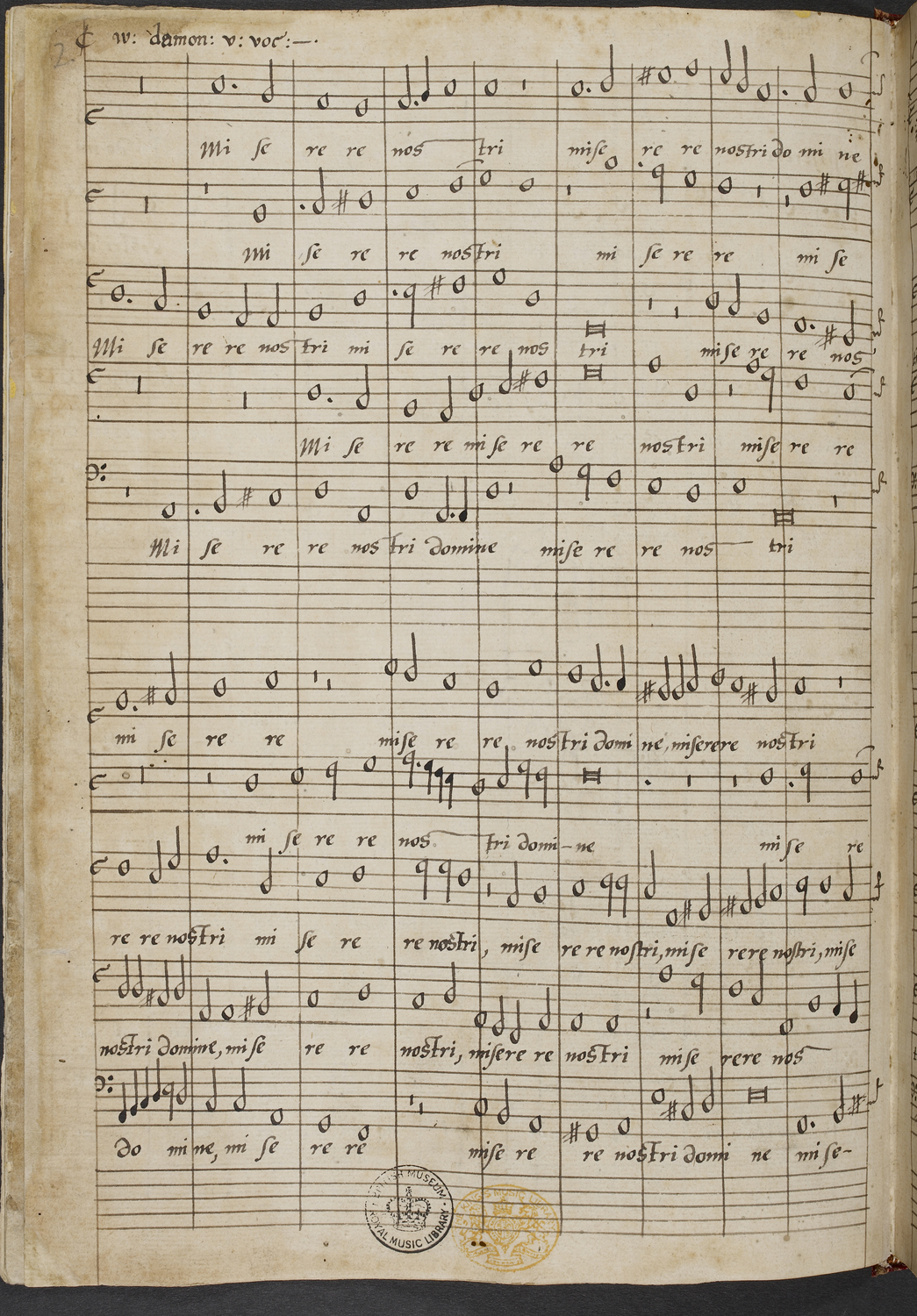
Miserere by William Daman, in the hand of John Baldwin: in the British Museum

Daman is thought to have been born in Liège (modern-day Belgium) around 1540 and came to England as a servant of Thomas Sackville, 1st Earl of Dorset on his return from Rome in 1566. In November of that year Daman married Anne Derifield at St James Garlickhythe in London, and the parish register of St Peter le Poer shows entries for baptisms or burials of eight of their children from 1572 to 1585. From 1576 until his death he was in the royal household of Elizabeth I, where he was one of six musicians in a recorder consort that played dance music. He died in 1591, and was buried at St Peter le Poer on 26 March.

== Works ==
Fantasia 'Di sei soprani’ from the Sambrook Manuscript, New York. NYp, Drexel 4302, p.259, no.46 (ca.1613-19)

Ut Re Mi Fa Sol La à3 from XX konincklycke fantasien. Mathysz press, Amsterdam (1648)
Performed by Phillip W. Serna, Treble, Tenor & Bass Viols with Violone

Daman was probably the earliest composer who set the Psalms in the vernacular to part-music. His work appeared first in 1579, printed by John Day, with a preface by Edward Hake, who relates how these compositions were secretly "gathered together from the fertile soyle of his honest frend, Guilielmo Daman", by one "John Bull, citezen and goldsmith of London", and how Bull "hasted forthwith of himself … to commit the same to the presse". The work appeared in four oblong quarto part-books, and is now of great rarity, the edition probably being bought up by the composer or his friends. An adaptation of the tune for Psalm 45 from 'The Psalmes in English Metre' 1579 is set to the hymn 'Lord Jesus, think on me' by A W Chatfield translated from the Greek of Synesius of Cyrene 375-430 (New English Hymnal #70a).

In 1591 another version of Daman's Psalms appeared from Thomas East's press. This work was published by William Swayne, and by him dedicated to Lord Burghley. In the preface to this work Swayne says that the former publication "not answering the expectation that many had of the auctor's skill, gave him occasion to take uppon him a new labour to recover the wrong his friend did in publishing that that was so done". The work appeared in two forms, in one of which the melody of the psalm is in the tenor part, in the other in the treble. Both versions are in four separate part-books.

The words of both the 1579 and 1591 editions are taken from Sternhold and Hopkins's version of the Psalms, but the contents of the two editions are not the same. Neither is entered in the register of the Stationers' Company. In the later publication Daman is styled "late one of her Majestie's Musitions".

Other surviving compositions include three instrumental works, one of which, a fantasia in six parts, was probably in the repertory of his recorder consort. A Miserere by Daman is preserved in the British Museum.
