= Thomas Whythorne =

English composer

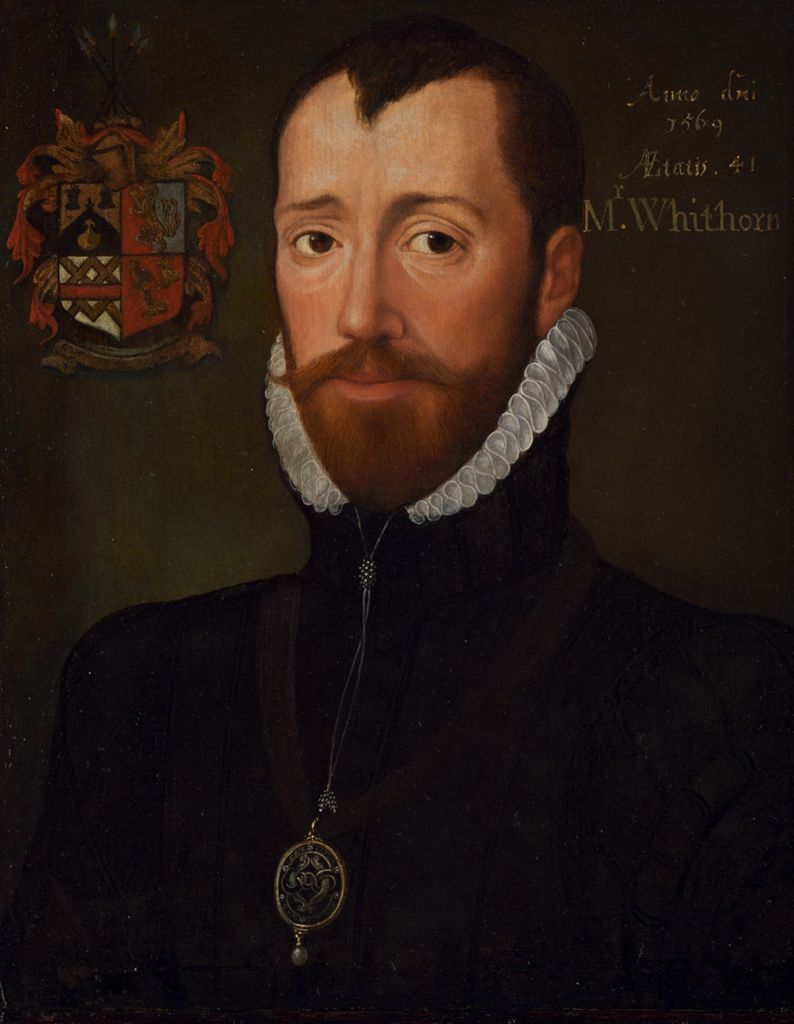
Thomas Whythorne

Thomas Whythorne (1528–1595) was an English composer who wrote what some consider to be the earliest known surviving autobiography in English.

== Early life and education ==
Born in Somerset (Whythorne was a Somerset spelling of the surname "Whitehorn") to a wealthy family, Whythorne was a chorister at Magdalen College, Oxford and attended Magdalen College School. On leaving the school he briefly attended Magdalen College itself, but left within a year to study under the writer and musician John Heywood. He did not inherit enough to live a life of leisure however and so became a music tutor to various members of the gentry.

== Career as musician ==
Chafing against his treatment by some employers as a mere servant (whom he considered below him due to his background and education), Whythorne searched for a patron to allow him to concentrate on composing. His musical manuscripts indicate that near the end of his life he found a patron in Francis Hastings, but little is known of this relationship despite Whythorne's lengthy preface.

Whythorne traveled widely throughout Europe and spent six months in Italy, learning its language and music. Whythorne returned to England in 1555, impressed by the continental respect for music and musicians that was absent in England. He later railed against the "blockheads and dolts" of England who failed to appreciate music. Whythorne wrote a book of his travels in Italy, no copy of which survives.

Upon his return to England, Whythorne served as a music tutor in Cambridge and London, where he survived a Bubonic plague outbreak in 1563 that killed members of his household. In 1571, he was appointed master of music at the Chapel of Archbishop Parker and published seventy-six Songes for Three, Fower, and Five voyces, the only English secular music known to have been published between 1530 and 1588. Another mentionable work, composed in 1590, is Whythorne's Duos or Songs for Two Voices.

== Autobiography ==
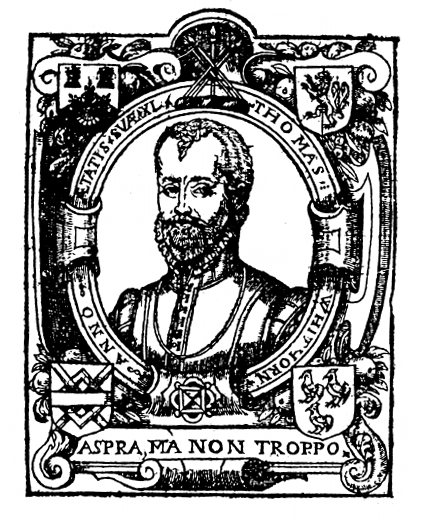
Frontispiece to his Duos or Songs for Two Voices (published 1590). A portrait of the composer suggests this engraving is a good likeness of the composer.

Around 1576 Whythorne collected his songs and poetry and linked them with autobiographical passages about his life and the situations which had led him to write each of the songs. The resulting book, entitled booke of songs and sonetts with longe discourses sett with them, is said to be earliest surviving English autobiography and one of the songs included, "Buy New Broom", is considered the earliest written example of music for voice with instrumental accompaniment.

In addition to its musical importance, Whythorne's autobiography reveals much about sixteenth-century social customs and habits. On widows, for example, Whythorne writes "He that wooeth a widow must not carry quick eels in his codpiece" and "He who weddeth a widow who hath two children, he shall be cumbered with three thieves."

== Legacy ==
Whythorne remained unknown until 1925 when the composer Peter Warlock published a study entitled Thomas Whythorne, An Unknown Elizabethan Composer. A manuscript of Whythorne's autobiography was rediscovered in 1955 in a box of papers from the home of Major Foley of Hereford and now resides in the Bodleian Library, while The Autobiography of Thomas Whythorne was published twice by Oxford University Press, first in 1961 in the author's phonetic spelling and then in modern spelling in 1962.
