= Richard Allison (composer) =

English composer

Richard Al(l)ison (born c. 1560–1570 – died before 1610) was an English composer. He wrote de la Tromba, a popular broken consort piece which has several professional recordings and first became well known due to the Julian Bream Consort.

He was known to be in the service of the Countess of Warwick in 1599, and then working for Sir John Scudamore. His publications are: The Psalms of David in Meter (1599) and An Hour's Recreation in musicke, apt for instruments and voyces (1606). His work also appears in Michael East's and Thomas Ravenscroft's psalters, and Thomas Morley's broken consort publication.

He referred in the dedication of his Psalmes to the late Ambrose Dudley, 3rd Earl of Warwick as 'my good Lord and Master'. Allison is represented by thirteen compositions in a set of consort books (dated 1588), from the household of Sir Francis Walsingham. Ten four-part settings by him appeared in East's Whole Booke of Psalms (1592), and he contributed a dedicatory poem to Giles Farnaby's Canzonets to Fowre Voyces (1598).

In 1599, he published his own Psalmes of David in Meter, giving his London address as Dukes Place, near Aldgate, and describing himself as a 'gentleman' and a 'practitioner' of music. This print also includes his coat of arms, providing much information about his family. In the same year, seven of his instrumental works appeared without attribution in Morley's First Booke of Consort Lessons (claims that Allison may have been the 'gentleman' who financed the publication remain unsubstantiated and seem improbable).

In 1606, he published An Howres Recreation in Musicke, acknowledging Sir John Scudamore (of Holme Lacy, near Hereford) as his patron. He is not heard of again, and may well have been dead by the time of Philip Rosseter's Lessens for Consort (1609) which includes four of his compositions, together with the information that most of the contents are by composers 'whose memorie only remaines'.

== Works, editions, recordings ==
- Goe from my window
- The Batchelars Delight
- De la Tromba Pavin
- Alison's Knell
- The Solo Lute Music of Richard Allison with Bandora and Cittern Arrangements, edited by John H. Robinson and Stewart McCoy with a biographical sketch by Robert Spencer (Lute Society Music Editions 1994)
