= Thomas Adams (publisher) =

Thomas Adams (in or before 1566–1620) was an English publisher.

== Biography ==
Son of Thomas Adams, a yeoman of Neen Savage, Shropshire, he became an apprentice to Oliver Wilkes, a member of the Stationers' Company in London, on 29 September 1582; he was transferred to a new master, George Bishop, on 14 October 1583 (Bishop's will indicates that Adams was a "kinsman"). Adams himself was admitted to the company on 15 October 1583. By 1591, he had established himself as a printer based at the sign of the White Lion at St. Paul's Churchyard in the city. His business may have started when printer Robert Walley transferred ownership of a vast collection of books and ballads to Adams, but existing copies indicate that Adams had these works printed for him by others.

In 1603, he branched out to the music publishing business, financing or printing several works by John Dowland (including The Third and Last Booke of Songes or Aires in 1603 and Andreas Ornithoparcus his Micrologus in 1609), his son Robert Dowland (Varietie of Lute-Lessons and A Musicall Banquet both in 1610), and Thomas Ravenscroft. John Dowland may have also considered Adams as publisher for Lachrimae, but ultimately decided against it.

In 1611, Adams moved to the sign of the Bell at St Paul's, where he would spend the remainder of his life. That same year, he purchased the rights to sixty important works of his former master, Bishop. It was during this period that Adams came into conflict with William Barley over patents to print several works. He ascended to the title of upper warden at the Stationers' Company in 1616. He is the likely publisher of Orlando Gibbons's Fantasies of III Parts (1620)—the title page bears the inscription, "London. At the Bell in St. Pauls churchyard". Adams died sometime between March and May 1620. His will was drafted on 2 March and executed on 4 May, naming as heirs or legatees his wife and three daughters, Elizabeth, Ann, and Mary, along with a brother George Adams. His wife Elizabeth continued printing works until 1625, when she sold the rights to Adams' former apprentice, Andrew Hebb. She appears to have maintained business interests in the industry at least to 1638, when the Bishop of London demised her two messuages with three shops in the cathedral churchyard.

== Bibliography ==
- Ashbee, Andrew; Peter Holman (1996). John Jenkins and His Time. Oxford, UK: Oxford University Press.
- Holman, Peter (1999). Dowland, Lachrimae (1604). Cambridge, UK: Cambridge University Press.
- Miller, Miriam. "Adams, Thomas (i)". Grove Music Online (subscription required). ed. L. Macy. Retrieved on 6 April 2008.
- Plomer, Henry Robert (1903). Abstracts from the wills of English printers and stationers, from 1492–1630. London, UK: London Bibliographical Society.
- Tedder, H. R. (September 2004; online edition: January 2008). Rev. Anita McConnell. "Adams, Thomas (b. in or before 1566, d. 1620)". Oxford Dictionary of National Biography (subscription required). Retrieved on 5 April 2008. The first edition of this text is available at Wikisource: "Adams, Thomas (d.1620?)" . Dictionary of National Biography. London: Smith, Elder & Co. 1885–1900.
- Timperley, Charles Henry (1839). A Dictionary of Printers and Printing. Edinburgh: H. Johnson.
- Wheatley, H. B. "Signs of Booksellers in St. Paul's Churchyard". Transactions of the Bibliographical Society. 9 (1906–1908): 67–106.
