= Thomas Snodham =

English printer (??–1626)

Thomas Snodham was an English printer. He was a specialist music printer, but music accounted for as little as 10 per cent of the books he printed. His other output included plays.

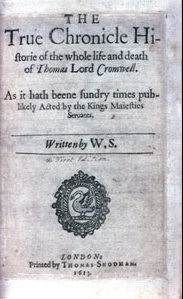
The second quarto of the play Thomas Lord Cromwell, printed by Snodham

== Early life ==
Snodham was the son of a draper. In 1595 he was apprenticed to his uncle, the printer Thomas East. East had started as a general printer, but from the 1580s he specialised in music printing after acquiring music type from the business of Thomas Vautrollier, a deceased printer. He printed works by well-known composers such as William Byrd, John Dowland, and Orlando Gibbons.

=== Early printing career ===
Snodham became a freeman of the Stationers Company in 1602. He printed his first book the following year, King James his entertainment at Theobalds, which was sold from East's premises. (Note: King Iames his entertainment at Theobalds vvith his welcome to London, together with a salutatorie poeme. By John Savile. The title refers to the final stage of King James´s progress from Scotland in 1603. The king approached London via Hertfordshire. In May 1603 he was at Theobalds House, where he received the homage of the Privy Council prior to entering the city.) Later in his career Snodham was involved in another project of interest to King James, the atlas of his realm compiled by John Speed.

When East died in 1608, he left a will making clear that he wanted Snodham to take over his business, while at the same time he made provision for the financial security of his widow Lucretia. Snodham acquired East's printing equipment. His later imprints place him in the parish of St Sepulchre, near Aldersgate — consistent with East’s likely location. He also worked with some of the same composers such as John Wilbye. For a while, the business continued to use the old name, presumably in the expectation of benefiting from goodwill. For example, the second set of Wilbye's 'Madrigals' (1609) is stated to be printed by "Thomas East, alias Snodham". While sales of Wilbye´s madrigals appear to have been respectable, the English craze for such compositions was waning by 1609. Madrigals continued to be published (for example Vautor´s "First set" of 1619, possibly printed by Snodham) but Snodham was taking an interest in new areas of publishing such as cartography.

== Snodham and English drama ==
In 1612, Snodham printed the first edition of Ben Jonson's play The Alchemist, which had been premiered in 1610 by the King's Men. The following year he printed the second quarto of Thomas Lord Cromwell.

== Snodham and John Speed ==
Snodham printed the text of Speed’s atlas The Theatre of the Empire of Great Britaine. However, the maps of this 1611/12 publication were engraved and printed in Amsterdam by a specialist in this kind of work, Jodocus Hondius. Hondius was supplied with the draft material for the maps by Speed and he worked on them for some years, sending proofs to London for checking.

While Snodham was not the publisher of the atlas, he remained in contact with the Hondius family after the death of Jodocus in 1612. He approached them when seeking an agent for the Latin version of the atlas. This suggests that the Latin version, which appeared in 1616, was intended for the continental market. Its scarcity has been cited as a reason to think it was not as successful as the English version, but print-runs for the atlas are not known.

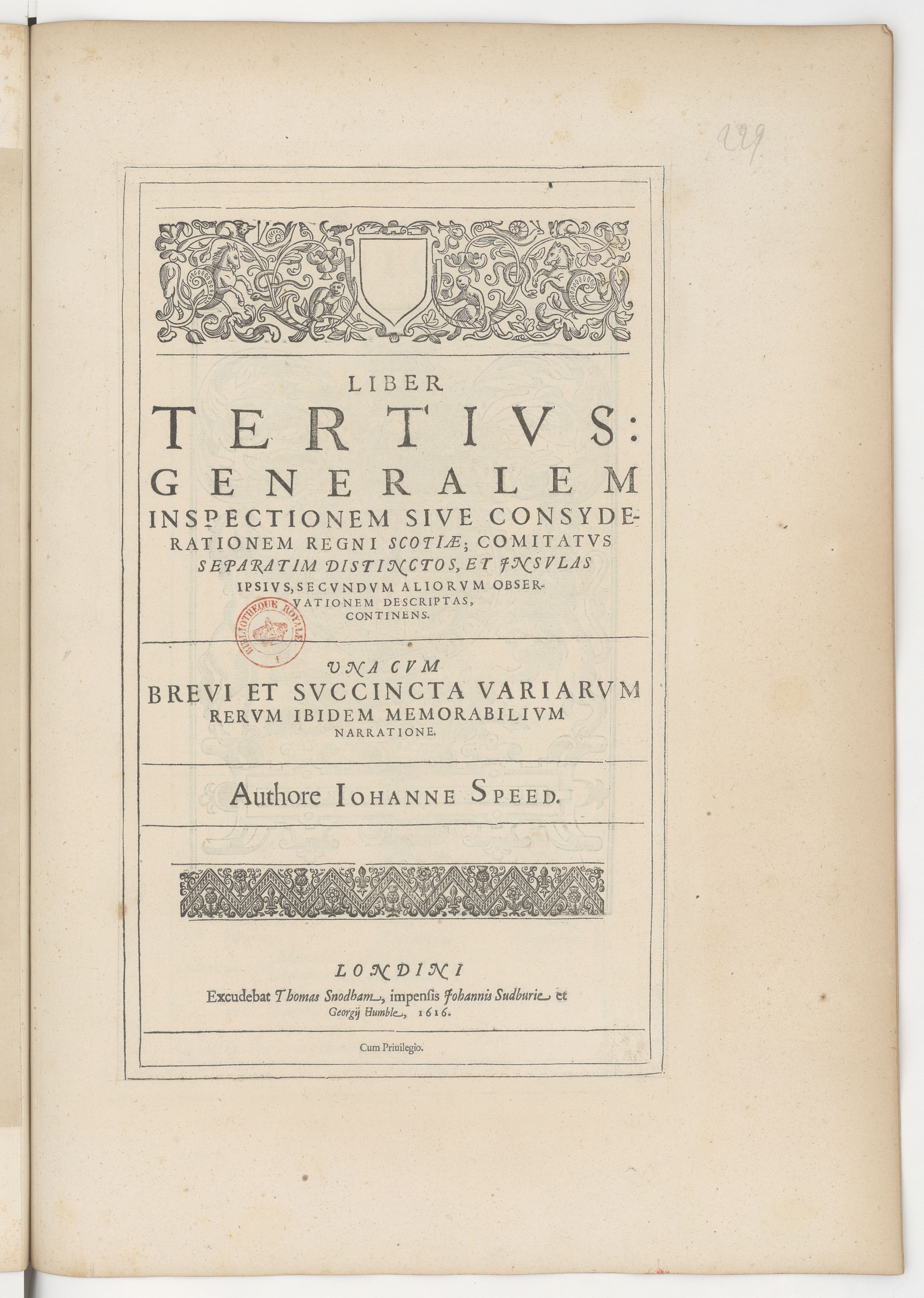
Text from the Latin version of the Speed atlas

Snodham died in 1626.

== Editions ==
- Gibbons, Orlando (1612). The First Set of Madrigals and Mottets of 5. Parts: apt for Viols and Voyces. London: Thomas Snodham. OCLC 1044329199.
- Ward, John (1613). The First Set of English Madrigals. London: Thomas Snodham.
