= Robert Jones (English composer) =

English lutenist and composer

Robert Jones (c. 1577 – 1617) was an English lutenist and composer, the most prolific of the English lute song composers (along with Thomas Campion).

He received the degree of B.Mus. from Oxford in 1597 (St. Edmund Hall). He ran a school in London. Records show that he had a patent (monopoly) to train children for the Queen's Revels between 1610 and 1615. In 1610, he collaborated with Philip Rosseter to present plays at the Whitefriars theatre. He was recorded as a Gentleman of the Chapel Royal in 1612.

He published five volumes of simple and melodious lute songs, and one of madrigals; he also contributed to The Triumphs of Oriana and Leighton's Teares. His 27 madrigals are mostly to texts about birds – birds merry, sweet, shrill, crowing or melancholic.

William Shakespeare quoted his song, 'Farewell, dear love', in Twelfth Night.

The date and place of Jones's death are not known.

== Known publications ==
- The First Booke of Songes and Ayres, 1600, dedicated to Robert Sidney, 1st Earl of Leicester (1563–1626)
- The Second Booke of Ayres, 1601, dedicated to Sir Henry Lennard, 12th Baron Dacre (1570–1616)
- Third book, 1605, dedicated to Henry Frederick, Prince of Wales (died 1612)
- The first set of madrigals of 3, 4, 5, 6, 7, 8. parts, viols and voices, 1607, dedicated to Robert Cecil, 1st Earl of Salisbury
- Ultimum vale, with a triplicity of musicke, ..., 1608
- A Musicall Dreame, or the Fourth Booke of Ayres ..., 1609, dedicated to Sir John Levinthorpe
- The Muses Gardin for delight, or the Fift booke of Ayres onely for the Lute, the bass Violl, and the Voyce, 1611, dedicated to Lady Mary Wroth (1587?–1651?)
