= Thomas Raynalde =

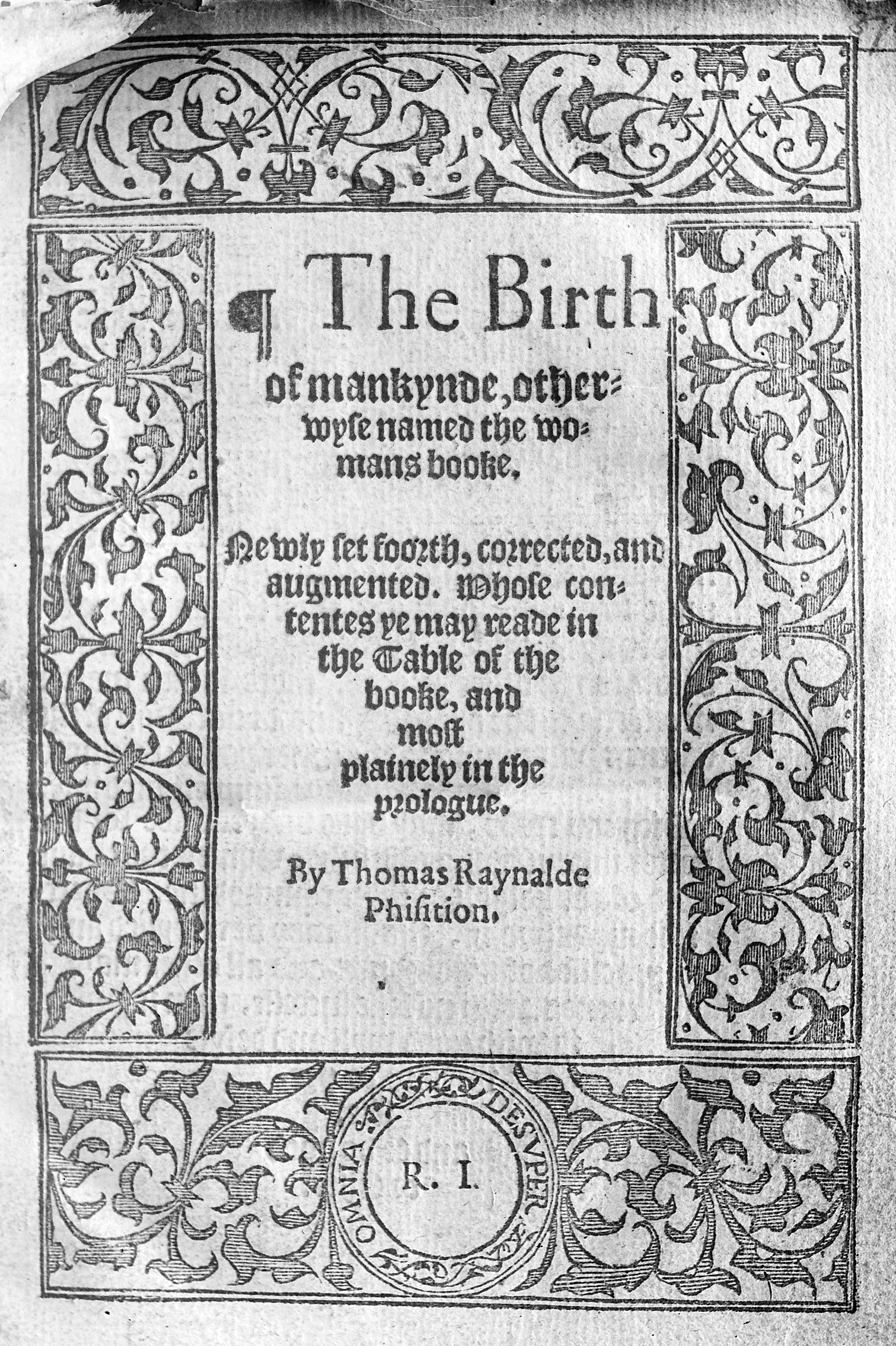
The title page of The Birth of Mankind

Thomas Raynalde (fl. 1540–1551) was an English physician, known as the translator or editor of Eucharius Rösslin's De Partu Hominis. The translation was published as The Byrth of Mankynde, otherwyse named The Womans Booke (often referred to as The Womans Booke) in 1545 and was highly successful, running to eleven or thirteen editions and remaining in use until 1654. A Compendious Declaration of the Excellent Vertues of a Certain Lateli Inventid Oile, published in 1551, is believed to have been written by the same person.

Little is known of his life, but it is now thought that Raynalde was a different person from the printer of the translation, of the almost identical name Thomas Raynald(e).
