= Henry Youll =

English madrigalist and composer

- Occupation: Composer

Henry Youll (also spelled Youell) (fl.1608) was an English madrigalist and composer active in Suffolk. His work included Canzonets to Three Voyces (London: Printed by Thomas Este [etc.], 1608). In recent times it has been published by Stainer & Bell (London, 1923), and recitals and recordings of the music have been made by madrigal groups worldwide.

Youll was tutor to the four sons of Edward Bacon, who was the third son of Sir Nicholas Bacon. It appears that those four sons were at Cambridge University together; Youll recalls "what a solace their company was once to you when I nursed them amongst you". "Canzonets to Three Voyces" is dedicated to them.

== Recordings ==
- The Sydney Society of Recorder Players, "The Merry Month of May" - (Hunt 1227)

== Publications ==
- Stainer & Bell, "Henry Youll: Canzonets to Three Voices" (1608), (Ref. EM28)
- Stainer & Bell, "Henry Youll: In the Merry Month of May" (1608)
- "Henry Youll: While Joyful Springtime Lasteth" (Published by Hal Leonard, HL.08551265))
- "Three English Madrigals. Pity me my own sweet Jewel. Fly not so fast. Messalina's Monkey", Roberton Publications (1977), ASIN: B0000D37SB
- "Pipe, Shepherds, Pipe" (Scott), ASIN: B0000D5FTH

=== References ===
- Oxford Dictionary of National Biography, Oxford University Press, ISBN 0-19-861411-X, ISBN 978-0-19-861411-1. The first edition of this text is available at Wikisource: "Youll, Henry" . Dictionary of National Biography. London: Smith, Elder & Co. 1885–1900.
- Here of a Sunday Morning, "The English Madrigal"
