= Michael East (composer) =

English composer

Love cannot dissemble, Fancy à2, No.1

I as well as thou, Fancy à2, No.2

Both alike, Fancy à2, No.3

Hold right, Fancy à2, No.4

Draw Out the End, Fancy à2, No.5

Follow me close, Fancy à2, No.6

Ut re my fa sol la, Fancy à2, No.7

Dally not with this, Fancy à2, No.8

The Nine Muses - Clio, the Muse of History, Fancy à3, No.9

The Nine Muses - Melpomene, the Muse of Tragedy, Fancy à3, No.10
From the Fancies à2, à3 & à4 from the Seventh Set of Bookes (1638). Performed by Phillip W. Serna, Bass Viols

Michael East (or Easte, Est, Este) (c. 1580–1648) was an English organist and composer. He was a nephew of London music publisher Thomas East (c. 1540–1608), although it was once thought that he was his son.

In 1601, East wrote a madrigal that was accepted by Thomas Morley for publication in his collection The Triumphs of Oriana. In 1606, he received a Bachelor of Music degree from the University of Cambridge and in 1609 he joined the choir of Ely Cathedral, initially as a lay clerk. By 1618 he was employed by Lichfield Cathedral, where he worked as a choirmaster, probably until 1644, when the Civil War brought an end to sung services. Elias Ashmole was a chorister at Lichfield, and later recalled that "Mr Michael East … was my tutor for song and Mr Henry Hinde, organist of the Cathedral … taught me on the virginals and organ".

East's exact date of death is not known, but he died at Lichfield. His will was written on 7 January 1648 and proved on 9 May 1648. It mentions his wife Dorothy, daughter Mary Hamersly, and a son and grandson both named Michael.

His most highly regarded works are his five-part fantasies for viols: Thurston Dart is quoted as saying, "despite some slipshod part-writing, they are among the best five-part consorts of the time".

== Works ==
East was one of the most published composers of his era; he published seven groups of compositions:

- Groups 1 and 2: madrigals for three and five voices
- Groups 3 and 4: anthems, madrigals, pastorales, napolitans and fancies for four to six voices (including instrumental fancies for viol consort)
- Group 5: twenty three-part pieces for viol
- Group 6: anthems and sacred consort songs for five and six voices, together with a setting of a poem by Sir Henry Wotton, honouring Princess Elizabeth, daughter of James I.
- Group 7: viol works for two to four voices
