= Thomas Bateson =

English composer (c. 1570–1630)

Thomas Bateson, Batson or Betson (c.1570 – 16 March 1630) was an Anglo-Irish composer of madrigals and vocal church music in the early 17th century.

== Life ==
Probably born in Cheshire, Bateson was organist of Chester Cathedral from 1599. He came to Dublin in April 1609 and served as organist and vicar choral at Christ Church Cathedral, Dublin from 1609 until his death.

In 1612 Bateson was the first Bachelor of Music at Trinity College, Dublin, a degree for which he submitted a seven-voice anthem entitled Holy, Lord God Almighty. He is known to have written more church music, but only this anthem has survived.

His fame mainly rests on madrigals, which give him an important place among late Elizabethan and Jacobean composers. He published two sets of madrigals in 1604 and 1618, and both collections have been reprinted in 1922 and again in 1958–60. He died in Dublin.
