= Michael Cavendish =

English composer

Michael Cavendish (c. 1565 – 1628) was an English composer of the Elizabethan and Jacobean periods.

A grandson of the writer George Cavendish and second cousin to Arabella Stuart, he spent much time at court and was for a time composer to the future King Charles I of England. In 1598, he published a set of songs with lute accompaniment, called Ayres in Tabletorie. He also collaborated with Thomas Morley.
