= John Ward (composer) =

English composer

Fantasia à6, VdGS No.1, Oxford. Bodleian Library, Mus.Sch.c.45-50
Performed by Phillip W. Serna, Treble, Tenor & Bass Viols

John Ward (1590–1638) was an English composer. He trained as a singer in Canterbury, where he was a chorister at Canterbury Cathedral. He then moved to London where he produced religious and secular works, and he also appears to have maintained a residence in Essex. Ward's compositions, some of which were published in his lifetime, consist of madrigals, works for viol consort and Anglican church music (services, and anthems). His madrigals are remarkable for their fine texts, broad melodic lines and originality.

== Biography ==
Ward was born in Canterbury and baptised 15 February 1590 at St Mary Bredman. He was a chorister at Canterbury Cathedral and likely King's scholar at Canterbury Grammar School 1604–7. He appears to have stayed in Canterbury until at least 1607 and then went to London where he served Sir Henry Fanshawe (1569–1616) as a musician. It is not known how the two men came into contact, although it has been noted that Lady Fanshawe was from Kent. Sir Henry was an amateur musician, and Ward's compositions suggest that he enjoyed hearing religious and secular music at home. Between 1610 and 1612 the music also reflects the connection of Sir Henry to Henry Frederick, Prince of Wales. Ward set a text celebrating the investiture of the prince in 1610.

Fanshawe's duties as remembrancer of the exchequer required him to spend some of his time in London where he had a house in Warwick Lane, he also had a country house Ware Park near Ware, Hertfordshire and property in Essex. The Fanshawe family appears to have employed more than one person called John Ward (if so, the other was possibly the composer's father), which makes some details of the composer's life difficult to establish. One important stage in his career was the publication of his "first set" of madrigals in 1613. Dedicated to his patron, the collection was printed by Thomas Snodham. It includes a lament for the Prince of Wales, who had died the previous year.

Sir Henry died in 1616. His will of 1613, which was witnessed by "John Ward" (possibly not the composer), mentions musical instruments. His eldest son and heir Thomas Fanshawe gave less support to the family's musical establishment, and went abroad in 1618 to continue his education. However, Ward continued to work for the family, albeit in a different capacity. Sir Henry had been the third consecutive member of the family to hold the office of remembrancer and the remembrancership was put in trust for Thomas when he went abroad. He took up his duties on his return to England in 1619. The Oxford Dictionary of National Biography suggests that it was probably about this time ("and certainly by April 1621") that Ward obtained a clerical post in the remembrancer's office.

Tribute was paid to Ward by Thomas Tomkins who in 1622 dedicated a madrigal to him.

== Personal life ==
Ward married Thomasine daughter of Thomas Clee of London dwelling at Tower Dock and had at least 5 children.

== Connections to Essex ==
Ward appears in the will of Henry Fanshawe's widow Elizabeth Smythe. Dated 20 February 1630, it described Ward as her "ancient servant" and he was named as trustee of her manor of Dengie by the Essex coast. Additionally, records show that he held property in Ilford Magna, Essex, where he died in 1638 (see note^{1}).

Although John Ward retained his job in the remembrancer's office in London until the year of his death, in the 1630s his home seems to have been eleven miles away in Ilford, where he is assumed to have taken on the mastership of the Ilford Hospital Chapel, This charity was run by the Fanshawe family between the 1570s and the Civil War. The site provided a chapel and accommodation for old men, as well as housing a chaplain and master. Ward was resident at the Masters House in Ilford as early as 1630 as two of his children appear in a local baptismal record dated August of that year.

== Works, editions and recordings ==
- First Set of English Madrigals of three, four, five, and six parts, apt both for Viols and Voices; with a mourning song, in memory of Prince Henry. Newly composed by John Ward. 1613 Edition: ed Fellowes, EM 19 1922, 1968 (rev).
- Two of Ward's madrigals are included in The Oxford Book of English Madrigals.

=== Recordings ===
- 1982 "complete": Consort of Musicke, Anthony Rooley, (Decca, two LPs; reissued on one CD by Australian Eloquence 2010).The First Set of English Madrigals; Four Fantasies for Viols.
- 1988 selection; with three unpublished madrigals not previously recorded (Hyperion)
- Madrigals and Fantasias, The Consort of Musicke. Anthony Rooley, director. 1994? Columns Classics WGPS 070981.
- Consort Music for Five and Six Viols - Phantasm (Linn 2009)

== Notes ==
1. His will dated 1 April 1634 was proved 31 August 1638.
