= Francis Pilkington =

English composer and singer (ca. 1565–1638)

Francis Pilkington (ca. 1565 – 1638) was an English classical composer, lutenist and singer, of the Renaissance and Baroque period. Pilkington received a B.Mus. degree from Oxford in 1595. In 1602 he became a singing man at Chester Cathedral and spent the rest of his life serving the cathedral. He became a minor canon in 1612, took holy orders in 1614 and was named precentor of the cathedral in 1623. Although he was a churchman, Pilkington composed largely secular music—ayres, madrigals, and lute songs. These include two sets of madrigals (1613/14 and 1624) and a collection of lute ayres (1605). He died in Chester.
