= John Day (printer) =

English Protestant printer (c. 1522–1584)

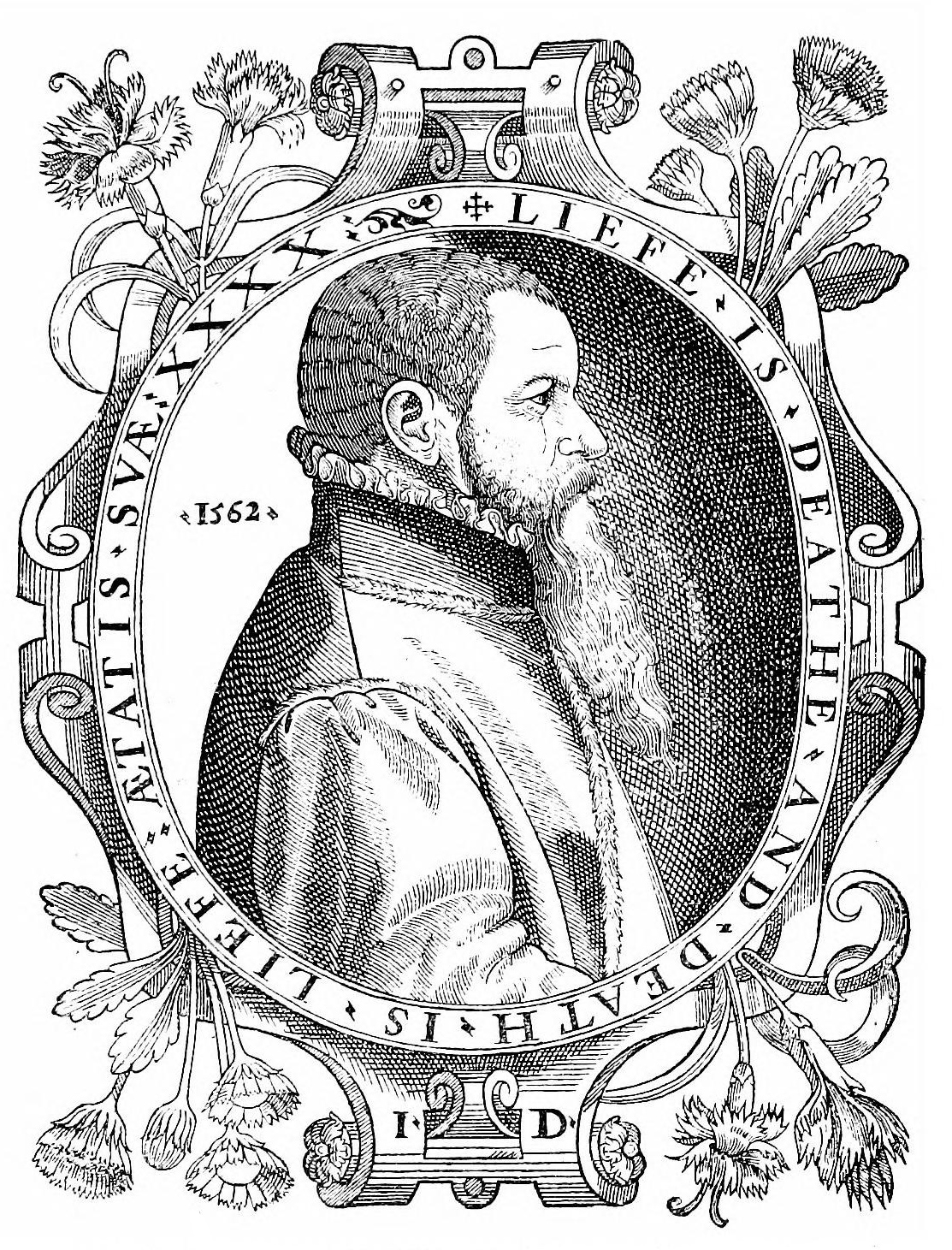
- Woodcut of Day (dated 1562) included in the 1563 and subsequent editions of Actes and Monuments
- Born: c. 1522
- Died: 23 July 1584 (aged around 61–62); Saffron Walden, England
- Occupation: Printer
- Movement: Protestantism

John Day (or Daye) (c. 1522 – 23 July 1584) was an English printer. He specialised in printing and distributing Protestant literature and pamphlets, and produced many small-format religious books, such as ABCs, sermons, and translations of psalms. He found fame, however, as the publisher of John Foxe's Actes and Monuments, also known as the Book of Martyrs, the largest and most technologically accomplished book printed in sixteenth-century England.

Day rose to the top of his profession during the reign of Edward VI (1547–1553). At this time, restrictions on publishers were relaxed, and a wave of propaganda on behalf of the English Reformation was encouraged by the government of the Lord Protector, Edward Seymour, 1st Duke of Somerset. During the reign of the Catholic Queen Mary I, many Protestant printers fled to the continent, but Day stayed in England and continued to print Protestant literature. In 1554, he was arrested and imprisoned, presumably for these illicit printing activities. Under Queen Elizabeth I, Day returned to his premises at Aldersgate in London, where he enjoyed the patronage of high-ranking officials and nobles, including William Cecil, Robert Dudley, and Matthew Parker. With their support, he published the Book of Martyrs and was awarded monopolies for some of the most popular English books, such as The ABC with Little Catechism and The Whole Booke of Psalmes. Day, whose technical skill matched his business acumen, has been called "the master printer of the English Reformation".

== Early career ==
Day's origins and the events of his early life remain obscure. Scholars have assumed that Day was born and raised in Dunwich, but there is no direct evidence that proves this claim. He may have been in London by 1540, as his name is mentioned in a city deposition as being a former servant of the printer and physician Thomas Raynalde. In 1546, he was probably one of twenty men who were granted the freedom of the city by redemption to work for the Stringers' Company of London.

The next year, he began printing with a partner, William Seres; the two based their operations at the parish of St Sepulchre in London. Day and Seres specialised in religious works, such as those by Robert Crowley, which were largely related to theological controversies of the time. The Protestant Reformation was advancing rapidly, and the laws against the publication of heretical works were being relaxed. In 1548, ten of the twenty works that the two men published were devoted to criticizing the Catholic belief of transubstantiation. One of those publications, a satirical poem by Luke Shepherd titled Iohn Bon and Mast Person, almost landed Day in jail. Day and Seres also translated important works of Continental Protestantism for the English market, notably Herman von Wied's A Simple and Religious Consultation in 1547.

In 1549, Day opened a new shop in Cheapside, and the next year, he and Seres were successful enough to amicably separate their businesses. Day set up his new home and printing establishment at Aldersgate in the parish of St Anne and St Agnes and transferred from the Stringers' to the Stationers' Company. Day found Aldersgate's foreigner-friendly attributes helpful in attracting skilled Dutch workers, whom he relied on throughout his career. He soon established himself as a quality printer, and in 1551, he reprinted an elaborate edition of the Bible that he had previously produced with Seres. The next year, he secured a valuable patent to print the works of John Ponet and Thomas Beccon. This enraged one of his competitors, Reginald Wolfe, who already held a patent to print Ponet's Catechism in Latin. Eventually, a compromise patent was issued which allowed Wolfe to continue printing the Catechism in Latin and Day to print the work in English. Day reaped more benefits from the deal than Wolfe: the English printings were used far more extensively than the Latin ones, and the ABC was eventually appended with Ponet's Catechism.

With a reputation for Protestant godliness and connections to people like John Dudley, William Cecil, and Catherine Willoughby, a successful career seemed assured for Day. Unfortunately for Day, Queen Mary ascended the throne in 1553 and the entire religious climate of the country changed. For years, it was thought that at the accession of Mary, Day fled to the Continent to avoid persecution. However, typographical and other evidence has convinced scholars that Day set up a clandestine press in premises connected to William Cecil in Lincolnshire, and that he continued to print Protestant polemical works under the pseudonym Michael Wood. The "Michael Wood" pamphlets included Protestant writings by Lady Jane Grey, John Hooper, and Stephen Gardiner, and attacks on Mary and her advisors.

On 16 October 1554, according to the diary of Henry Machyn, Day was caught and sent to the Tower of London for printing "naughty books". In the Book of Martyrs, Foxe records statements made in prison to Day by the future martyr John Rogers, "spake being then in prison, to the Printer of this present booke, who then also was layd up for lyke cause of religion". Perhaps because the flight of foreign Protestant workers under Mary was causing a shortage of printers, Day was released the next year and allowed to work again, but only as a jobbing printer. He reunited with Seres (also recently released from prison) to produce works of Catholicism for Catholic printer John Wayland, a far cry from the Protestant polemics he printed prior to imprisonment. He also served as the official printer of the City of London for two years.

== Elizabethan period ==
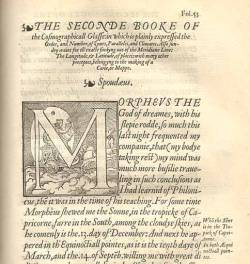
A page from Cuningham's Cosmographical Glasse printed by Day in 1559

With the death of Mary and the accession of Elizabeth I in 1558, Day's business blossomed once more. Day was already close to Cecil, who had now become one of the new Queen's top advisors. Through Cecil, Day was awarded the valuable monopoly on printing ABCs. He also befriended Robert Dudley (son of John Dudley), another of Elizabeth's favorites. With the help of his connections, Day was able to obtain a lucrative patent to print William Cuningham's Cosmographical Glasse. He produced the first edition in 1559 using a new italic font of the highest quality (probably cut by François Guyot) and a large number of impressive woodcuts. Day absorbed the high production costs himself, since he knew the work would solidify his reputation as a master printer. Day's patent to print Cuningham—his first under Elizabeth—gave him exclusive rights to the work for life; it also allowed him to retain a monopoly for seven years on any other original works that were not covered by other patents, were "compiled at Day's expense", and were "not repugnant to Holy Scripture or the law". This stipulation would be an important source of income for the rest of his life.

Day took advantage of the monopoly clause, reestablishing his Edwardian patent for The ABC with Little Catechism. In 1559, he obtained a patent for The Whole Booke of Psalmes, Collected into English Meter, a metrical psalter, compiled mostly by Thomas Sternhold and John Hopkins, that Day first published in 1562. The Stationers' Company guaranteed Day the right to print all "psalmes in metre with note", in other words, psalms with music. Despite the fact that psalms had usually been learned by rote, the business proved lucrative, reflecting a rise in musical literacy during the period. The Whole Booke of Psalmes became the period's best-selling book and the standard English psalter of its time. Day's monopolies on these perennially popular works would form the basis of great wealth over the years and a good deal of conflict between him and his fellow stationers. In legal proceedings towards the end of Day's life, it was estimated that these particular patents were worth between £200 and £500 per year.

=== Actes and Monuments ===
In 1563, Day undertook the work for which he is best known, John Foxe's Actes and Monuments (also called The Book of Martyrs). Day and Foxe probably met through Cecil, and the two became close collaborators. Foxe was among those who seized on the advances in the printing trade as a tool for the spread of the Protestant Reformation. There is a tradition that Foxe, who revised and added material while the book was being set in type, actually lived at Day's shop at Aldersgate during the production of the book; he certainly received correspondence there and visited regularly. Day heavily invested time and money in the production of Foxe's book, the largest publishing project undertaken in England to that time, and he took an active part in the compilation of the material. Day used changes in type sizes or fonts to distinguish Foxe's editorial insertions from texts of his sources. The resulting lavish folio filled with woodcuts was an expensive luxury item, but it sold well and Day profited from his investment.

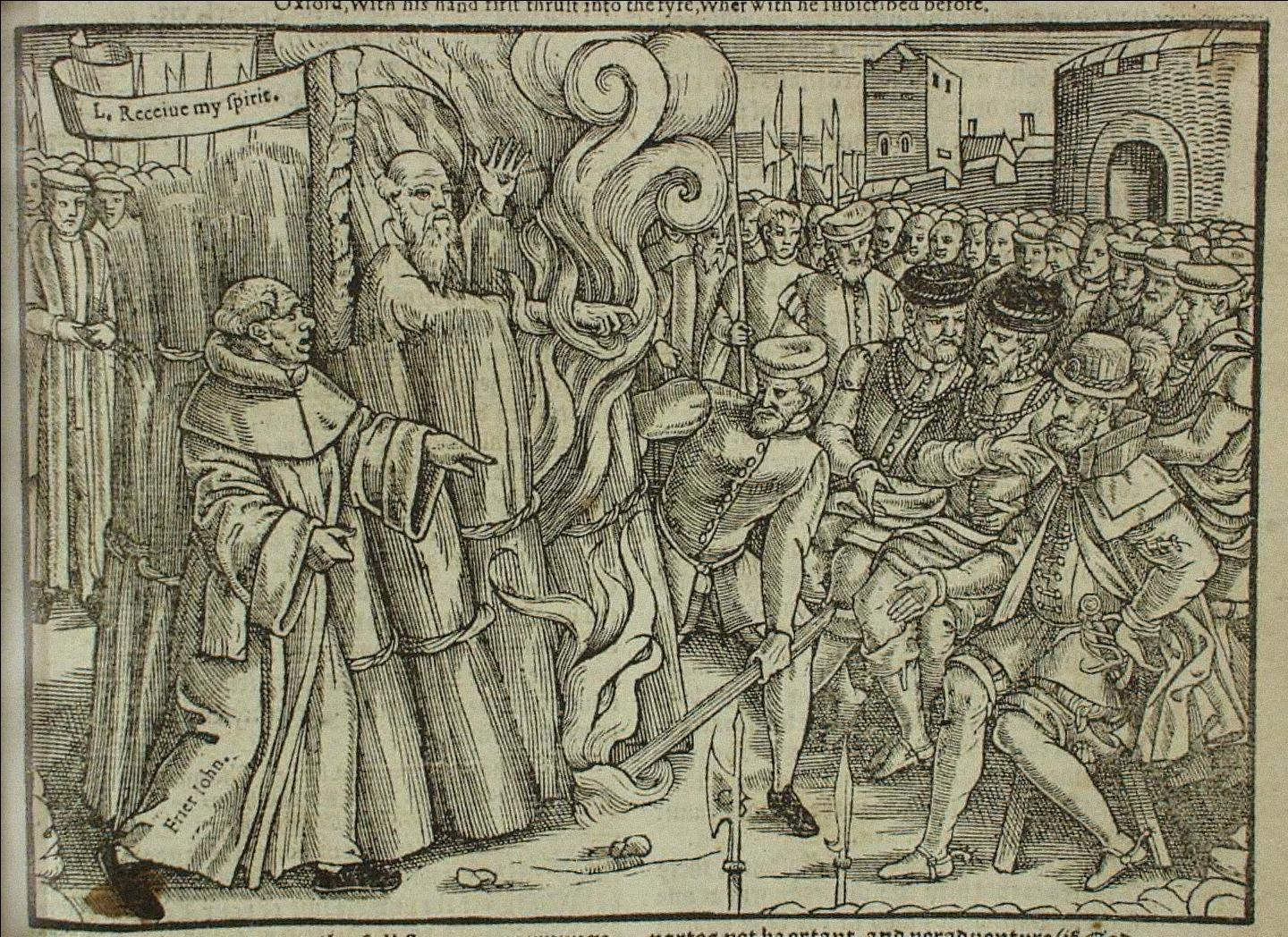
Woodcut from Day's 1563 first printing of John Foxe's Actes and Monuments depicting the execution of Thomas Cranmer, 1556

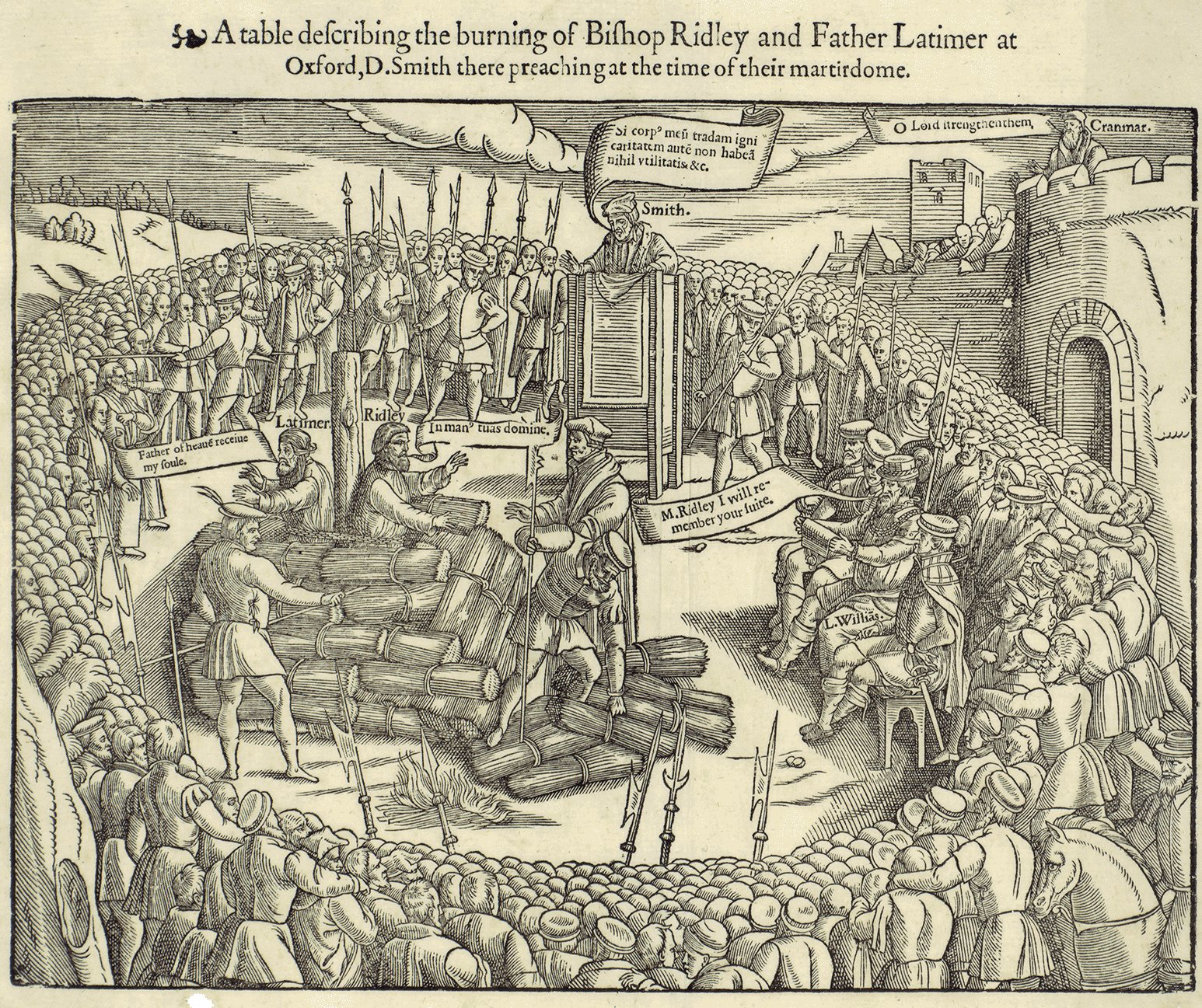
Woodcut from John Foxe's Actes and Monuments depicting the burning of Hugh Latimer and Nicholas Ridley in 1555

Day continued to take on challenging and difficult projects. He had already printed the first English book of church music in 1560. In 1567, Matthew Parker, the Archbishop of Canterbury, commissioned Day to print a collection of writings attributed to the tenth-century Aelfric of Eynsham. For this work, Day, known for his fine and varied fonts, had the first-ever font of Anglo-Saxon type cut. The cost was borne by Parker, perhaps Day's most important patron. The font may have been designed by François Guyot, a French type-founder known to have worked for Day and lived in his household. Day used the same font to print Lambarde's Archaionomia (a collection of Anglo-Saxon laws) in 1568. In 1570, he printed Billingsley and Dee's English Euclid, which included folding and movable diagrams—one of the first printed books ever to do so. In the same year, he printed Ascham's Scholemaster.

Day and Foxe completed a second edition of the Book of Martyrs in 1570. It was even larger than the first—a total of 2,300 pages in two enormous folio volumes—and at one point, Day ran out of paper (which he imported) and had to paste smaller sheets together to make do. This edition received official recognition: William Cecil and the Privy Council directed the church to ensure that copies were available to parishioners, and in 1571, the Convocation ordered that every cathedral church and the household of every senior member of the clergy should own a copy. The edition has been recorded as costing sixteen shillings, roughly equivalent to two months' wages for a skilled London clothworker at the time.

=== Final years and legacy ===
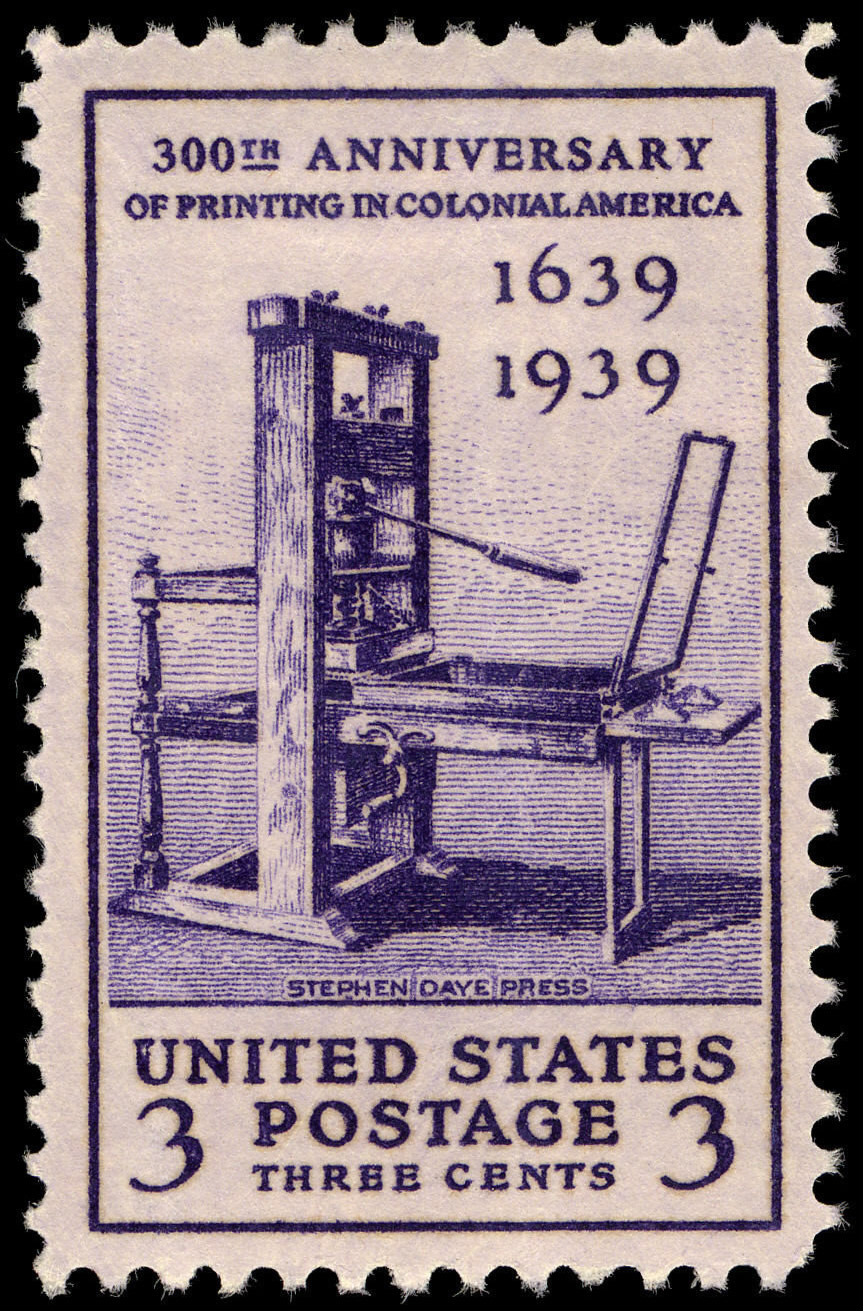
In 1939 the U.S. Post Office issued a stamp depicting Daye's printing press, commemorating the 300th anniversary of printing in colonial America.

By the late 1570s, there was open discontent among the less wealthy members of the Stationers' Company about Day's extensive patents. He was compelled to go to court against printers who pirated works to which he owned the rights. Among those brought to trial was Roger Ward, who admitted to pirating 10,000 copies of ABC with Catechisms in a font which imitated Day's. Day's former apprentice and sub-contractor John Wolfe admitted in court that he had pirated The Whole Booke of Psalmes but justified his actions on the grounds that Day's monopolies were a restraint of trade. It was Wolfe who led a group of "poor printers", as they called themselves, in a campaign against the patents in the late 1570s. As a result of an official investigation, Day was eventually obliged to concede certain titles to the Company for the benefit of the poorer printers, but he kept the titles he printed most.

In 1580, Day became Master of the Stationers' Company, and focused vigorously on defending the industry against piracy. His official powers included the right of "search and seizure", which he did not hesitate to exercise on behalf of the trade or to further his own interests. In 1584, he sent men to break into Wolfe's premises and destroy any materials relating to suspected piracy. Four years before, he had even destroyed his son Richard's printing equipment after Richard had printed the ABC and the Psalmes without his permission. Though Richard was technically co-patentee of these titles, John Day pursued him into the courts and all but destroyed his printing career.

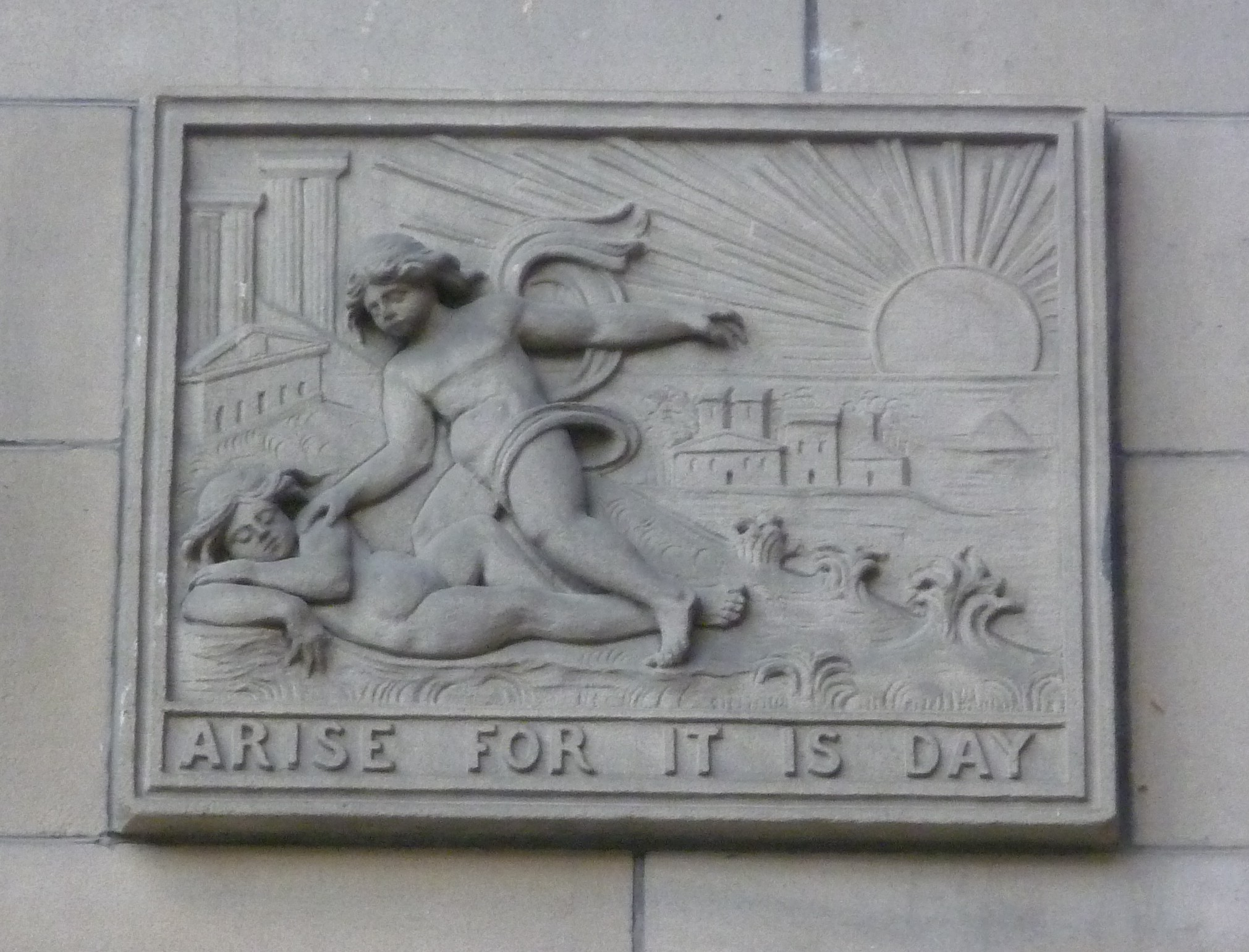
John Day commemorative tablet, Edinburgh Central Library

In 1582, Day's health began to deteriorate quickly. Though weakening, he raced to complete another edition of Actes and Monuments in 1583, printing it on at least four presses. It was unusual for books of this size and ambition to go beyond one or two printings. Holinshed's Chronicles, the only book of the time to rival the Book of Martyrs in scope and reputation, never went into a third edition.

Day died on 23 July 1584 at Walden in Essex. He married twice and fathered twenty-four children. His eldest sons by his first marriage was Richard (b. 21 December 1552) and Edward, while his eldest sons by his second wife, Alice, was John (religious) and Lionel (studious). Day's printer's device showed a sleeper awakening, with the motto "Arise for it is Day," both a play on his name and an allusion to the new era of religious reform, in which he was a significant figure.
