= Printing patent =

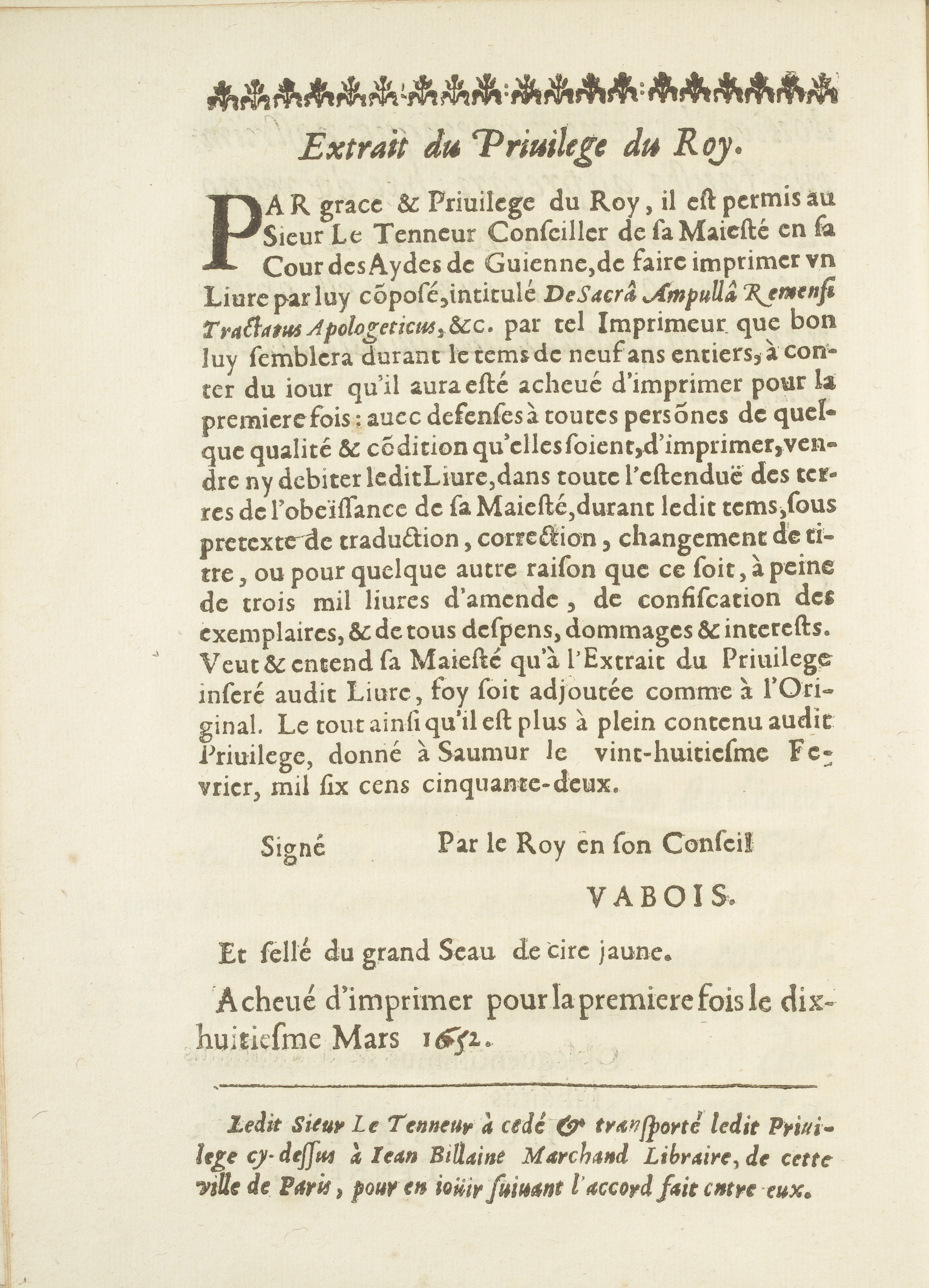
A 1652 permit privilege

The printing patent or printing privilege was a precursor of modern copyright. It was an exclusive right to print a work or a class of works.

== History ==
=== Origins ===
The earliest recorded printing privilege dates from 1469, giving John of Speyer a five-year monopoly on all printing in Venice. In 1495, the Republic granted another monopoly, for a fixed period,on all Greek works to Aldus Manutius as a reward for his investments in a Greek font for Aldine Press.

=== Printing privileges in France ===
In France, the royal Code de la librairie of 1723 codified existing practice. It stated that there was no property in ideas or texts. Ideas, it was argued, were a gift from God, revealed through the writer. God's first representative, the French king had the exclusive right to determine what could be printed by whom. Only members of the royal guild of publishers could apply for a "printing privilege", a permission and an exclusive right to print a work. Authors wishing to see their manuscript printed had no choice but to sell it to guild members. Most printing privileges were owned by the guild and automatically renewed over generations. In 1789, the National Assembly created by the French Revolution brought an end to all royal privileges.

=== Royal prerogative in England ===
English monarchs granted printing patents based on the royal prerogative, with patents falling into one of two categories: particular patents gave an exclusive right to print a single work – often popular, classic works written centuries earlier – for a limited time, usually seven or ten years. General patents were usually granted for life and covered a class of works, such as law books or almanacs. Printing patents were independent of the private copyright system established by the Stationers' Company, even though most printing patents were granted to members of the Company. The importance of printing privileges decreased over time, but they still existed after the Statute of Anne was enacted. The royal prerogative relating to printing patents was not removed until 1775.

== See also ==
- John Day (printer), a printer who obtained several royal printing patents
- Privileged presses
- Letters patent
