= Philip Rosseter =

English composer and musician

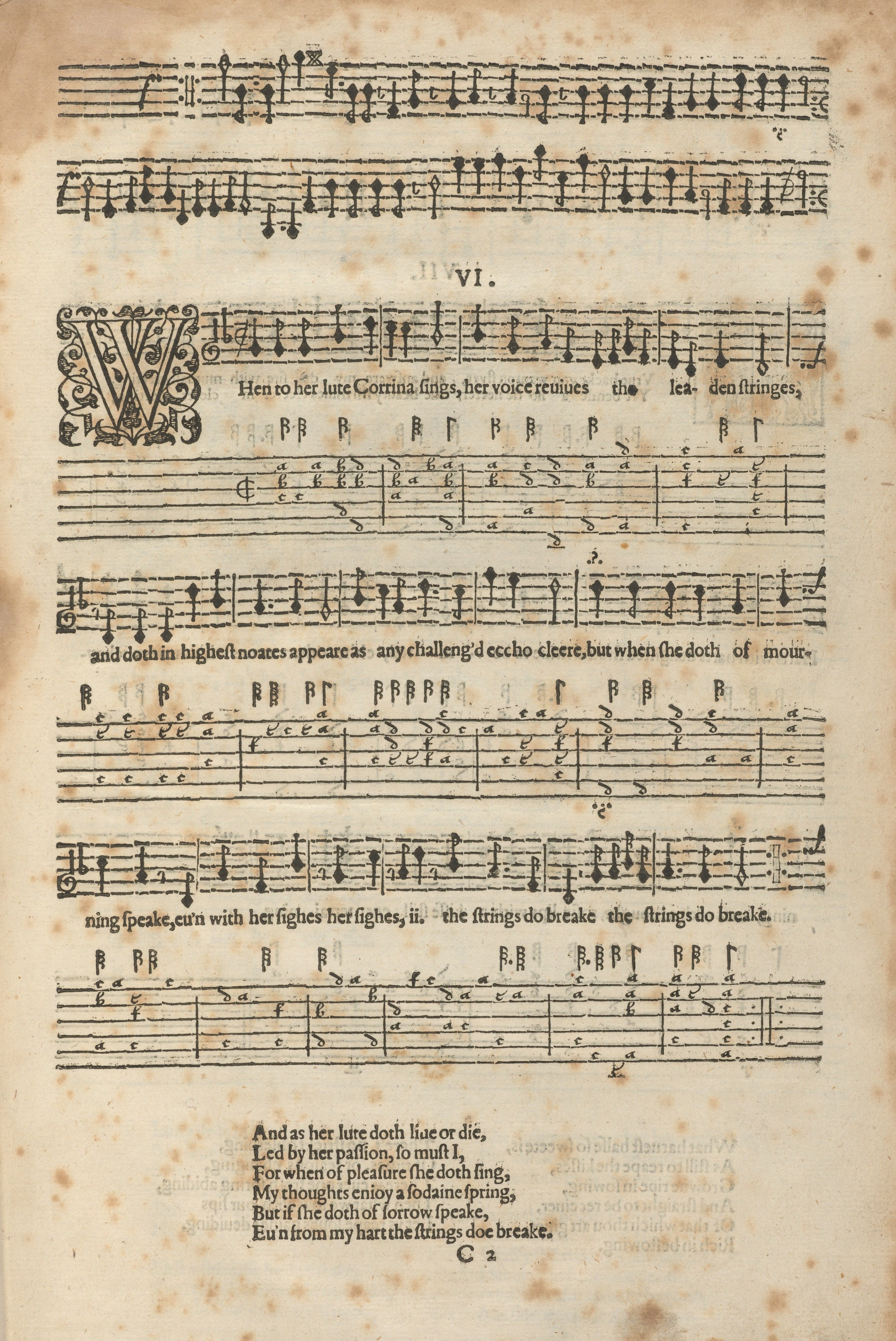
Page from A Book of Ayres, 1601

Philip Rosseter (1568 – 5 May 1623) was an English composer and musician, as well as a theatrical manager. His family seems to have been from Somerset or Lincolnshire, he may have been employed with the Countess of Sussex by 1596, and he was living in London by 1598. In 1604 Rosseter was appointed a court lutenist for James I of England, a position he held until his death in 1623. Rosseter is best known for A Book of Ayres which was written with Thomas Campion and published in 1601. Some literary critics have held that Campion wrote the poems for Rosseter's songs; however, this seems not to be the case. It is likely that Campion was the author of the book's preface, which criticizes complex counterpoint and "intricate" harmonies that leave the words inaudible. The two men had a close professional and personal relationship; when Campion died in 1620, he had named Rosseter his sole heir.

Rosseter's lute songs are generally short, homophonic, with minimal repetition or word painting (imitating textual meanings through music), while at the same time being rich in musical invention. Rosseter's only other book was Lessons for Consort (1609) for a broken consort of bandora, cittern, lute, flute, and treble and bass viol, which contains arrangements of his own and others' music.

Rosseter was also involved in the Jacobean theatre. In 1609 he and Robert Keysar became shareholders in a company of boy actors, the Children of the Chapel. The company had lost their royal patronage in 1606 as a result of their satire of Jacobean court scandals, but Rosseter was permitted to restore their former title, the Children of the Queen's Revels, in 1610. Rosseter remained connected to the Jacobean court during this period, in 1612 and 1613 he produced three plays by the "Children of the Chapel" for Prince Charles, Princess Elizabeth and the Prince Palatine, and he played the lute on 15 February 1613 in George Chapman's The Memorable Masque of the Middle Temple and Lincoln's Inn, a part of the celebrations at the wedding of Princess Elizabeth and Frederick V of the Palatinate.

In 1614, the Children of the Queen's Revels' lease for Whitefriars Theatre expired, and Rosseter obtained a licence from King James to build a new theatre at Porter's Hall, near the Blackfriars Theatre. Boundary changes brought the site within the City of London, however, where the lord mayor and aldermen strongly objected to the establishment of the theatre. After a controversial trial in which Lord Chief Justice Coke found for the London authorities, the nearly-completed playhouse was demolished in 1617. Rosseter made attempts to operate the boy actors, now known as the Children of the Late Queen's Revels, as a touring company, but he withdrew as a shareholder by 1620, and the company disbanded shortly afterwards.

A piece entitled Rosseter's Galliard by Giles Farnaby is included in the Fitzwilliam Virginal Book (no. CCLXXXIII), probably a setting of one of Rosseter's compositions.

One of his compositions was used by Martin Shaw and then arranged by Mont Campbell to become 'Garden of Earthly Delights' on the album Arzachel by Prog Rock group Uriel in 1969.
