= Thomas Morley =

English composer, organist and editor (1557–1602)

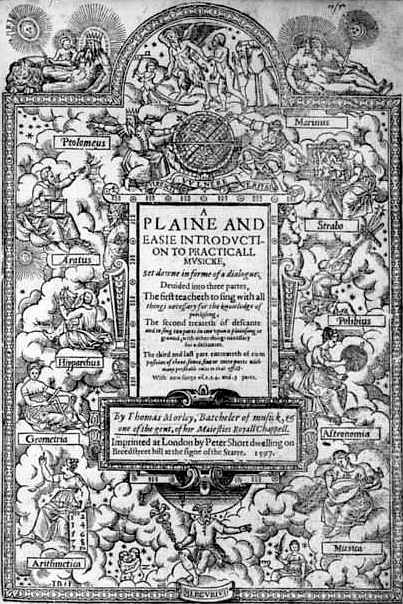
- Title page of Morley's Plaine and Easie Introduction to Practicall Musicke (1597)
- Born: c. 1557; Norwich, England
- Died: early October 1602 (aged 45); London
- Occupations: Composer, organist and madrigalist

Thomas Morley (1557–early October 1602) was an English composer, theorist, singer, and organist of late Renaissance music. He was one of the foremost members of the English Madrigal School. Referring to the strong Italian influence on the English madrigal, The New Grove Dictionary of Music and Musicians states that Morley was "chiefly responsible for grafting the Italian shoot on to the native stock and initiating the curiously brief but brilliant flowering of the madrigal that constitutes one of the most colourful episodes in the history of English music".

Living in London at the same time as Shakespeare, Morley was the most famous composer of secular music in Elizabethan England. He and Robert Johnson are the composers of the only surviving contemporary settings of verse by Shakespeare.

Morley was active in church music as a singer, composer and organist at St Paul's Cathedral in London. He was involved in music publishing; from 1598 up to his death he held a printing patent. He used the monopoly in partnership with professional music printers such as Thomas East.

== Life and career ==
Thomas Morley was born in the English city of Norwich, the son of a brewer. It is likely he was a boy chorister at Norwich Cathedral. He became the choirmaster of the cathedral in 1583. He may have been a Roman Catholic, but he was able to avoid prosecution as a recusant, and there is evidence that he may have been an informer on the activities of Roman Catholics.

Morley moved from Norwich to London before 1574 to be a chorister at St. Paul's Cathedral. Around this time, he studied with the composer William Byrd, whom he named as his mentor in his 1597 publication A Plain and Easie Introduction to Practicall Musicke. In 1588, Morley received his bachelor's degree from the University of Oxford; shortly after this time he was employed as organist at St. Paul's in London. His young son died the following year. He and his wife Susan had three more children between 1596 and 1600.

In 1588, Nicholas Yonge published his Musica transalpina, the collection of Italian madrigals fitted with English texts, which touched off the explosive and colourful vogue for madrigal composition in England. Morley found his compositional direction at this time, and shortly afterwards published the first of 11 of his collections of madrigals.

Recorded performance of "It was a lover and his lass"

Morley lived for a time in the same London parish as Shakespeare. A connection between the two has been long speculated, but never proven. His 1600 setting of Shakespeare's "It was a lover and his lass" from As You Like It has never been established as having been used in a performance during the playwright's lifetime.

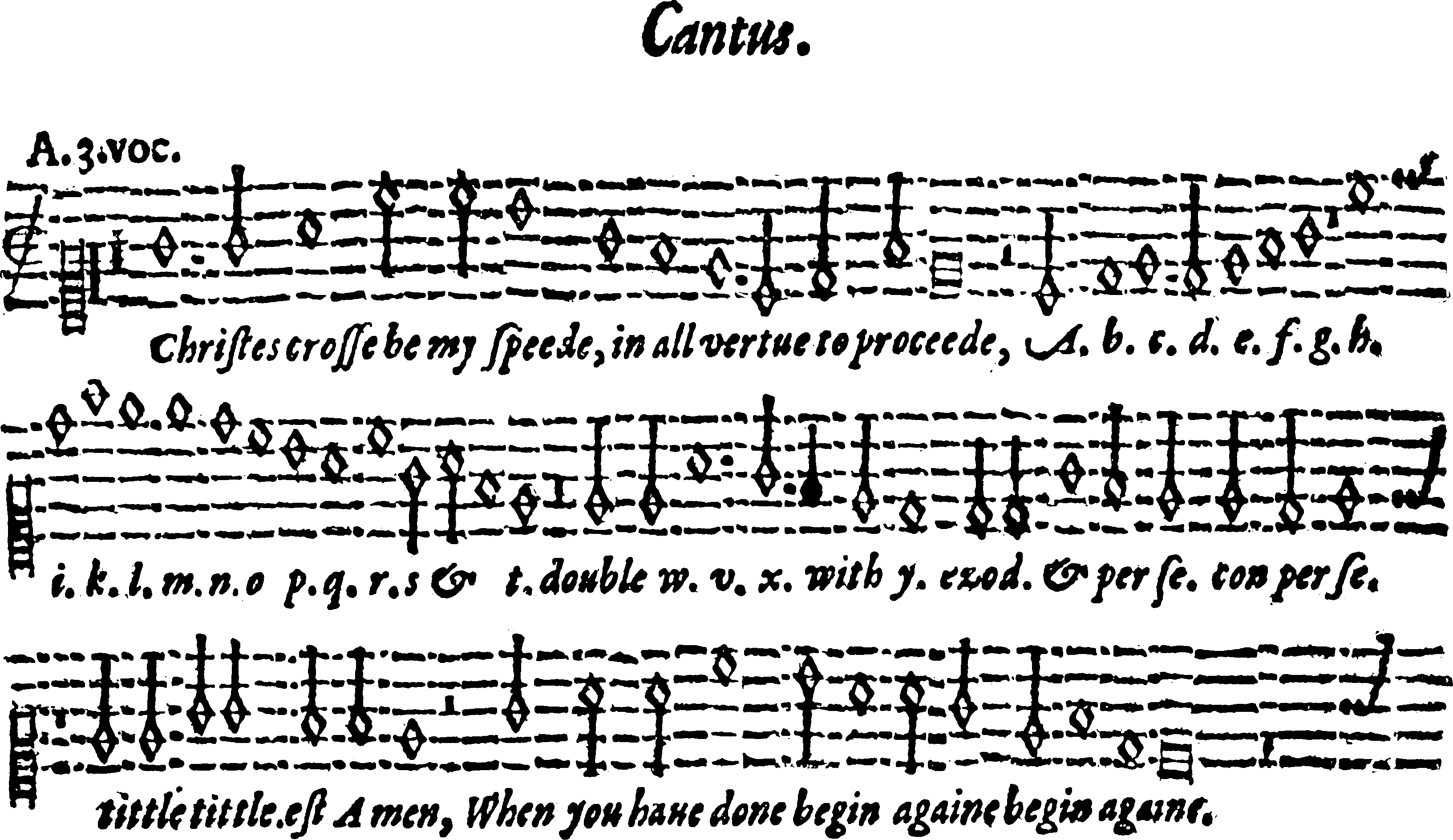
From a song by Morley from A Plaine and easie Introduction to Practical Musicke

While Morley attempted to imitate the spirit of Byrd in some of his early sacred works, it was in the form of the madrigal that he made his principal contribution to music history. His work in the genre has remained in the repertory, and shows a wider variety of emotional colour, form and technique than anything by other composers of the period. Usually his madrigals are light, quick-moving and easily singable, like his well-known "Now Is the Month of Maying" (which is actually a ballett); he took the aspects of Italian style that suited his personality and anglicised them. Other composers of the English Madrigal School, for instance Thomas Weelkes and John Wilbye, were to write madrigals in a more serious or sombre vein.

Morley wrote instrumental music, including keyboard music (some of which has been preserved in the Fitzwilliam Virginal Book), and music for the broken consort, a uniquely English ensemble of two viols, flute, lute, cittern and bandora, notably as published by William Barley in 1599 in The First Booke of Consort Lessons, made by diuers exquisite Authors, for six Instruments to play together, the Treble Lute, the Bandora, the Cittern, the Base-Violl, the Flute & Treble-Violl.

Morley's Plaine and Easie Introduction to Practicall Musicke (1597) remained popular for almost 200 years after his death in 1602, and is still an important reference for information about 16th century composition and performance.

Thomas Morley was buried in the graveyard of the church of St Botolph Billingsgate. His grave is lost, as the area was destroyed during the Great Fire of London of 1666.

== Compositions ==
Thomas Morley's compositions include (in alphabetical order):

- April is in my mistress' face
- Arise, get up my deere
- Cease mine eyes
- Come, lovers, follow me
- Come, Sorrow, come
- Crewell you pull away to soone
- Christes crosse
- Do you not know?
- Fair in a morn
- Fantasia for keyboard, Fitzwilliam Virginal Book CXXIV
- Fantasie: Il Doloroso
- Fantasie: Il Grillo
- Fantasie: Il Lamento
- Fantasie: La Caccia
- Fantasie: La Rondinella
- Fantasie: La Sampogna
- Fantasie: La Sirena
- Fantasie: La Tortorella
- Fire Fire My Heart
- Flora wilt thou torment mee
- Fyre and Lightning
- Goe yee my canzonets
- Good morrow, Fayre Ladies of the May
- Harke Alleluia!
- Hould out my hart
- I goe before my darling
- I saw my Lady weeping
- I should for griefe and anguish
- In nets of golden wyers
- It was a lover and his lass
- Joy, joy doth so arise
- Joyne hands
- La Caccia "The Chase"
- La Girandola
- Ladie, those eies
- Lady if I through griefe
- Leave now mine eyes
- Lirum, Lirum
- Lo hear another love
- Love learns by laughing
- Miraculous loves wounding
- Mistress mine
- My bonny lass she smileth
- Nolo mortem peccatoris
- Now is the month of maying
- O Mistresse mine
- O thou that art so cruell
- A painted tale
- Say deere, will you not have me?
- See, see, my own sweet jewel
- Shepard's Rejoice
- Sing we and chant it
- Sleep, slumb'ring eyes
- Sweet nymph
- Thirsis and Milla
- Those dainty daffadillies
- Though Philomela lost her love Oxford Book of English Madrigals
- 'Tis the time of Yuletide Glee
- What is it that this dark night
- What ayles my darling?
- When loe by break of morning
- Where art thou wanton?
- Will you buy a fine dog?
- With my love my life was nestled

=== Sacred music ===
- The Burial Service
- De profundis clamavi
- Domine, dominus noster
- Domine, non est exultarem cor meum
- Eheu sustulerunt domine
- The First Service
- How long wilt thou forget me?
- O amica mea

== See also ==
- The Triumphs of Oriana (1601) edited by Morley

== Sources ==
- Murray, Tessa (2014). Thomas Morley: Elizabethan Music Publisher. Woodbridge: Boydell Press. ISBN 978-1-84383-960-6.
