= Can She Excuse My Wrongs =

16th-century song by John Dowland

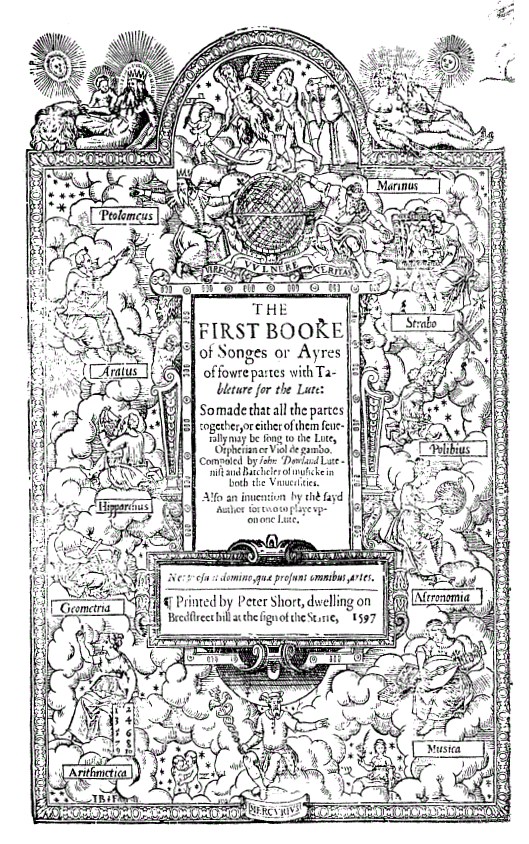
Front page of The First Booke of Songes or Ayres of Foure Partes with Tableture for the Lute, 1597

"Can She Excuse My Wrongs" is a late 16th-century song by the English Renaissance composer John Dowland, the fifth song in his First Booke of Songes or Ayres (Peter Short, London 1597). The words are set to a dance-tune, a galliard.

The song is associated with Robert Devereux, 2nd Earl of Essex, who was executed for treason in 1601 after he rebelled against Elizabeth I. The song is sometimes referred to as "The Earl of Essex Galliard", although that title normally refers to an instrumental version, "The Earl of Essex his galiard", scored for viol consort and lute.

== Identity of the poet ==
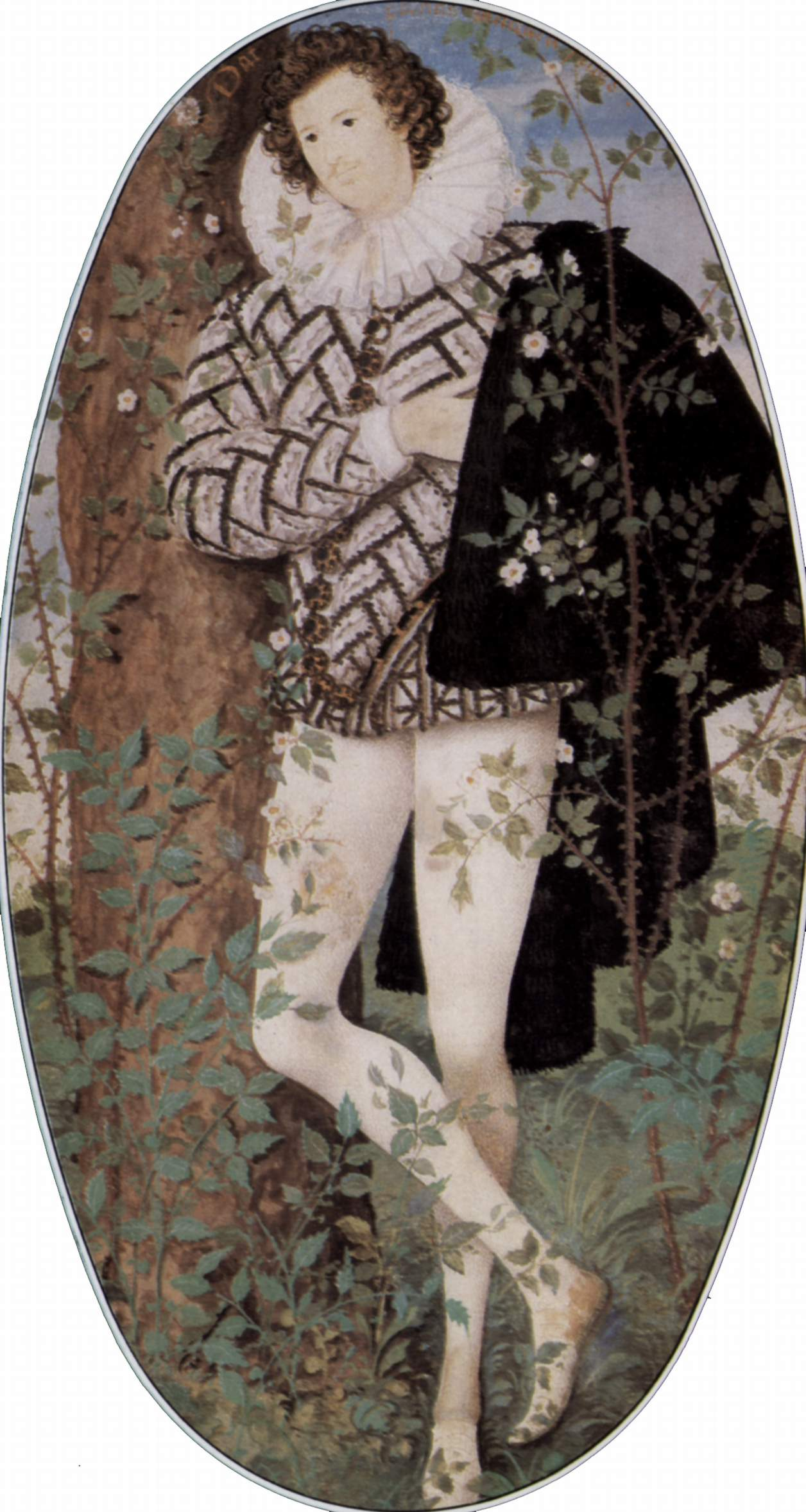
Young man, possibly the Earl of Essex, c.1588. Nicholas Hilliard, Victoria and Albert Museum.

Dowland's lyricists are often anonymous, their identities lost over time. Given this, it is often unclear as to whether the tune or the text came first. The tune for "Can She Excuse My Wrongs" was included in the "Dowland Lutebook", now in Washington, completed at least before 1594, before any earlier dating of the text. Edward Doughtie notes that the lyrics do not have a metric structure that combines well with music, and at times forces the singer into unusual word stresses. Bertrand Harris Bronson makes a similar observation, noting how the timing and meter of the tune forces "the text into its service". The upbeat and energetic style and pace of the music seems to be at odds with the somewhat downbeat mood of the lyrics. For these reasons it is generally assumed that the lyrics were a later addition.

"Can She Excuse My Wrongs" has been widely attributed to Robert Devereux, 2nd Earl of Essex (1565–1601), but the lack of surviving documentation make it impossible to discern if in fact Essex was the lyricist. He is certainly a possible candidate: other poems by him survive and there is another lute-song associated with him, "To plead my faith", set by Daniel Batcheler. However, the attribution of "Can She Excuse" largely rests on the posthumous dedication of the galliard published in Dowland's 1604 collection Lachrimae, or Seaven Teares. By this time Essex's Rebellion had become less controversial. When Essex was executed his title was made extinct. However, as Essex had favoured James to succeed to the throne, James I was sympathetic to those involved in the Rebellion, and restored the title in 1604 for his son Robert Devereux, 3rd Earl of Essex. Dowland's dedication of the same year was therefore not risky in the way it would have been in previous years.

It has also been suggested that Dowland makes a veiled reference to the Earl in the third strain by quoting the melody of the popular early 16th-century Tudor ballad, "Will Yow Walke the Woods soe Wylde". Contemporary listeners would have picked up the allusion to woods, and, according to some scholars, would have gone on to make the connection to the Earl's habit of retreating to the woods north-east of London where he had a house. Both retreat to the country and, drawing from older poetic traditions, the utilisation of woodland imagery, were common features of this type of ballad. The song has been interpreted as recording the poet's feelings of exile and alienation, after being banished from court to the countryside, presumably having fallen from favour with Elizabeth I. This was a popular theme in Tudor poetry and lyrical balladry, and often the poet would use the sense of political alienation to make acute, often satirical commentary on the world of the court, with all its intrigues and jostling for position.

== The lover as banished courtier ==
The lyrics present a stereotypical Petrarchan lover, and appear to form a personal plea to Elizabeth I. Essex is known to have addressed poems to the Queen. The song appeared before Essex's greatest failure, his period as Lord Lieutenant of Ireland which led to his ill-fated coup d'état, but he had previous fallings-out with her. Many commentators see the favours ("high joys") the poet expects from his disdainful mistress as political rather than sexual.

Elizabeth I’s status as an unmarried monarch in 16th-century England made her a frequent subject of contemporary lyricists and poets. This literary focus intensified during the final two decades of the 16th century. Some historians have suggested that the Queen encouraged this attention as a political strategy to manage the ambitions and rivalries of her potential suitors.

== Music ==
The tune of "Can She Excuse My Wrongs" has a complex rhythm, which is typical of Dowland's style:

Although the key signature suggests D minor, the B natural in the first line indicates the use of the Dorian mode, at least for that line.

Dowland gave more than one option for performance of the song. It is often performed as a lute song by soloist and lute, but, like other songs in the First Book, was originally printed in a format that can also be performed as a madrigal by a small vocal group (SATB). The video of Sting's version of the song shows how the musicians could have sat around a single music book. As one of the finest lutenists of his time, Dowland would presumably have played the lute part, although he may also have performed as a singer.

Although Dowland worked for aristocratic patrons, the First Book was aimed at a wider market, and it is assumed that he did not compose "Can She Excuse My Wrongs" with highly trained singers in mind. The book sold well and appeared in various editions during the composer's lifetime.

Both Dowland and others arranged "Can She Excuse My Wrongs" for various instruments. Dowland created a version for five viols (which he published in Lachrimae or Seaven Teares Figured in Seaven Passionate Pavans) and another version for solo lute. In 1609 "Can She Excuse My Wrongs" was published in an arrangement by Dowland's contemporary Thomas Robinson. It may have inspired a number of other pieces, including the unattributed "Can Shee" in the keyboard collection Fitzwilliam Virginal Book, and the "Galliard Can she excuse" transcribed in Thomas Morley's 1599 First Booke of Consort Lessons.

The First Booke of Songes was reprinted in the nineteenth century by the Musical Antiquarian Society. Dowland's music was important to the early music revival and has been perceived as relatively accessible to modern audiences.

== Legacy and recordings ==
The song's popularity in Elizabethan England can be gauged by the sales of the sheet music (The First Book of Songs) which went into several editions and sold thousands of copies. This was good for the time, and higher than the sales of The Second Book of Songs.

There are vintage recordings of the song by singers such as Alfred Deller (counter-tenor), and Sir Peter Pears (tenor), who worked with the lutenists Desmond Dupré and Julian Bream respectively. The song’s highest chart performance was achieved by Sting (sometimes described as a baritone, although he has also been included among tenors in non-classical music) and Edin Karamazov (lute), who included a version in their 2006 album Songs from the Labyrinth.

== Sources ==
- Gibson, Kirsten. "'So to the Wood Went I': Politicizing the Greenwood in Two Songs by John Dowland". Journal of the Royal Musical Association, Volume 132, No. 2, 2007. 221-251
- Holman, Peter. "Dowland: Lachrimae (1604)". Cambridge University Press, 1999. ISBN 0-5215-8829-4
