= The Journey and the Labyrinth =

Live album by Sting and Edin Karamazov
- Released: 13 February 2007
- Recorded: 4 October 2006
- Venue: Lake House (Italy), St. Luke's Church (London)
- Genre: Classical
- Label: Deutsche Grammophon

The Journey and the Labyrinth is a live music album performed by Sting and Edin Karamazov. It was released in 2007 by Deutsche Grammophon.

== Background ==
The record consists of an audio CD recorded at St. Luke's church, London, as well as a DVD documentary, which includes rehearsal footage and live performance from St. Luke's.

Sting and Karamazov also collaborated on the 2006 studio album Songs from the Labyrinth. The latter record features similar material, mainly compositions by John Dowland. However, unlike the live album, the studio album does not include any twentieth-century compositions.

== Track listing ==
=== DVD ===
1. "Come Again"
2. "Project Origin"
3. "Can She Excuse My Wrongs"
4. "The Lute and the Labyrinth"
5. "The Lowest Trees Have Tops"
6. "Flow My Tears"
7. "Dowland's Exile"
8. "Clear and Cloudy"
9. "Political Intrigue"
10. "Have You Seen the Bright Lily Grow"
11. "Weep You No More, Sad Fountains"
12. "Le Rossignol"
13. "Religion"
14. "Sting and the Lute"
15. "Come, Heavy Sleep"
16. "In Darkness Let Me Dwell"
17. "Choir Rehearsal"
18. "Fine Knacks for Ladies"
19. "Can She Excuse My Wrongs"

=== CD ===
1. "Flow My Tears (Lachrimae)" – 4.41
2. "The Lowest Trees Have Tops" – 2.25
3. "Fantasy" – 2.46
4. "Come Again" – 2.53
5. "Have You Seen the Bright Lily Grow" (lyrics by Ben Johnson) – 2.38
6. "In Darkness Let Me Dwell" – 4.05
7. "Hellhound on My Trail" (Robert Johnson) – 3.15
8. "Message in a Bottle" – 5.58
