= Now o now I needs must part =

Song by John Dowland

Now, o now I needs must part sung by the Collegium Vocale Bydgoszcz

Now o Now I Needs Must Part is a song by the sixteenth-seventeenth-century composer John Dowland. The lyrics, a bittersweet contemplation of love and loss, are anonymous. The song was first published in Dowland's collection First Booke of Songes or Ayres of foure partes with Tableture for the Lute (1597).

Often regarded as a lute song, it can be sung in more than one way. Dowland provides four part harmony, and the words can be sung as a solo with instrumental accompaniment or by four voices.

== Lyrics ==
Now, O now, I needs must part,
Parting though I absent mourn.
Absence can no joy impart:
Joy once fled cannot return.
While I live I needs must love,
Love lives not when Hope is gone.
Now at last Despair doth prove,
Love divided loveth none.

Sad despair doth drive me hence,
This despair unkindness sends.
If that parting be offence,
It is she which then offends.

Dear, when I am from thee gone,
Gone are all my joys at once.
I loved thee and thee alone,
In whose love I joyed once.
And although your sight I leave,
Sight wherein my joys do lie,
Till that death do sense bereave,
Never shall affection die.

Dear if I do not return
Love and I shall die together,
For my absence never mourn,
Whom you might have joyed ever.
Part we must, though now I die.
Die I do to part with you.
Him despair doth cause to lie,
Who both lived and died true.

== Recordings ==
The complete First Book has been recorded by the tenor Rufus Müller with Christopher Wilson (Decca, 1993) and the soprano Grace Davidson with David Miller (Hyperion, recorded 2016).

== Related work ==
Dowland used the same tune in a dance that he composed for the lute, the Frog Galliard.
