= 1607 in music =

The year 1607 in music involved some significant events.

== Events ==
- January 6 – Lord Hay's Masque is performed at Whitehall Palace, with music by Thomas Campion and other composers.
- February 24 – Première of Claudio Monteverdi's opera L'Orfeo, with libretto by Alessandro Striggio the Younger, at the Ducal Palace of Mantua.
- March 1 – Francesco Gonzaga writes that the Duke of Mantua is pleased with Monteverdi's L'Orfeo and that the work had "been to the great satisfaction of all who heard it". Its second performance takes place on this date.
- Fourteen-year-old Girolamo Frescobaldi is appointed organist at the church of Santa Maria in Trastevere in Rome, thanks to his patron Guido Bentivoglio.
- Francesca Caccini marries Giovanni Battista Signorini.

== Publications ==
- Agostino Agazzari
  - First book of madrigaletti for three voices (Venice: Ricciardo Amadino)
  - Second book of madrigaletti for three voices (Venice: Ricciardo Amadino)
- Gregor Aichinger
  - Cantiones ecclesiasticae (Dillingen: Adam Meltzer)
  - Virginalia: laudes aeternae Virginis Mariae... (Dillingen: Adam Meltzer)
- Adriano Banchieri
  - Ecclesiastiche sinfonie for four voices, Op. 16 (Venice: Ricciardo Amadino)
  - Virtuoso ridotto tra signori, e dame, entr'il quale si concerta recitabilmente in suoni et canti una nuova comedia detta prudenza giovenile, fifth book for three voices, Op. 14 (Milan: Simon Tini & Filippo Lomazzo), a madrigal comedy
- Bartolomeo Barbarino – Second book of Madrigali di diversi autori for solo voice with theorbo, harpsichord, or other instruments (Venice: Ricciardo Amadino)
- Lodovico Bellanda – Musiche ... per cantare sopra il chitarrone et clavicimbalo (Music for singing with the theorbo and harpsichord) (Venice: Giacomo Vincenti), a collection of songs for solo voice
- Giulio Belli
  - Compieta, falsi bordoni, mottetti, et litanie della Madonna for six voices and continuo (Venice: Alessandro Raverii)
  - Compieta, falsi bordoni, antifone, et litanie della Madonna for four voices and continuo (Venice: Alessandro Raverii)
- Severo Bonini – Madrigali, e canzonette spirituali del M. R. P. D. Crisostomo Talenti, vallombrosano, et del sig. Giovambatista Marino for solo voice with theorbo, harpsichord, or other instrument (Florence: Cristofano Marescotti)
- William Byrd – Gradualia, Book 2, for four, five, and six voices (London: Thomas East for William Barley)
- Diomedes Cato
  - Pieśń o świętym Stanisławie (Song of Saint Stanislaus) (Kraków: B. Skalski)
  - Rytmy łacińskie uczynione od krolewica polskiego Kazimierza (Kraków: B. Skalski), a collection of sacred music in lute tablature
- Giovanni Luca Conforti – Passagi sopra tutti li salmi che ordinariamente canta Santa Chiesa (Venice: Angelo Gardano & fratelli)
- Camillo Cortellini – Magnificat for six voices (Venice: Giacomo Vincenti)
- Giovanni Croce – Fourth book of madrigals for five and six voices (Venice: Giacomo Vincenti)
- Scipione Dentice – Fifth book of madrigals for five voices (Naples: Giovanni Battista Sottile)
- Johannes Eccard
  - Epithalamion nuptiis Iohannis Stobaei et Elisabethae Hausmann for six voices (Königsberg: Georg Osterberger), a song for the wedding of Johann Stobaeus
  - Psalmus CXXVII (Cum dederit dilectis suis somnum) for six voices (Königsberg: Georg Osterberger), a wedding song
  - Harmonia musica (Docti fulgebunt quasi splendor firmamenti) for five voices (Königsberg: Georg Osterberger), a graduation song
- Thomas Ford – Musicke of sundrie kindes, set forth in two bookes (London: John Browne)
- Melchior Franck – Melodiarum sacrarum for five, six, seven, eight, nine, ten, eleven, and twelve voices (Coburg: Justus Hauck)
- Marco da Gagliano – Officium defunctorum for four voices (Venice: Angelo Gardano & brothers)
- Bartholomäus Gesius
  - Magnificat per quintum & sextum tonum for six voices (Frankfurt an der Oder: Friedrich Hartmann)
  - Der XC. Psalm (Herr Gott du bist unser Zuflucht) for five voices (Frankfurt an der Oder: Friedrich Hartmann), a funeral motet
- Hans Leo Hassler – Psalmen und christliche Gesäng for four voices (Nuremberg: Paul Kauffmann)
- Tobias Hume – Captaine Humes Poeticall Musicke (London: John Windet), a collection for two bass viols
- Johannes Jeep – Studentengartlein, vol. 1
- Tiburtio Massaino
  - Musica per cantare con l'organo for one, two, and three voices, Op. 32 (Venice: Alessandro Raverii), a collection of sacred songs
  - First book of motets for seven voices with organ bass, Op. 33 (Venice: Alessandro Raverii)
- Claudio Merulo – Second book of ricercari da cantare for four voices (Venice: Angelo Gardano & fratelli), published posthumously
- Claudio Monteverdi – Scherzi Musicali, Book 1, for three voices (Venice: Ricciardo Amadino), a collection of madrigals
- Pomponio Nenna
  - Responsories for Christmas and Holy Week for four voices (Naples: Giovanni Battista Sottile)
  - Sixth book of madrigals for five voices (Naples: Giovanni Battista Sottile)
- Asprilio Pacelli – Motets and psalms for eight voices (Frankfurt)
- Salustio Palmiero – First book of madrigals for five voices (Venice: Giacomo Vincenti)
- Enrico Antonio Radesca – Armoniosa corona, a collection of motets, psalms, and falsobordoni for two voices and continuo (Milan: Simon Tini & Filippo Lomazzo), also contains one piece by Giovanni Battista Stefanini
- Salamone Rossi – a collection of sinfonie and gagliarde

== Opera ==
- Feb 24 — Claudio Monteverdi – L'Orfeo, favola in musica, in the Ducal Palace, Mantua

== Births ==
- March 12 – Paul Gerhardt, German hymn-writer (died 1676)
- November 1 – Georg Philipp Harsdorffer, librettist (died 1658)
- November 6 – Sigmund Theophil Staden, German composer (died 1655)

== Deaths ==
- March 11 – Giovanni Maria Nanino, Italian composer and teacher (born 1543/4)
- June 7 – Johannes Matelart, Flemish composer (born c. 1538)
- September 10 – Luzzasco Luzzaschi, Ferrarese composer (born c.1545)
- September – Claudia Cattaneo, court singer and wife of Claudio Monteverdi
