= Christopher Wilson (lutenist) =

British musician

Christopher Wilson (born 1951) is a British lutenist who has performed widely and recorded several albums.

== Career ==
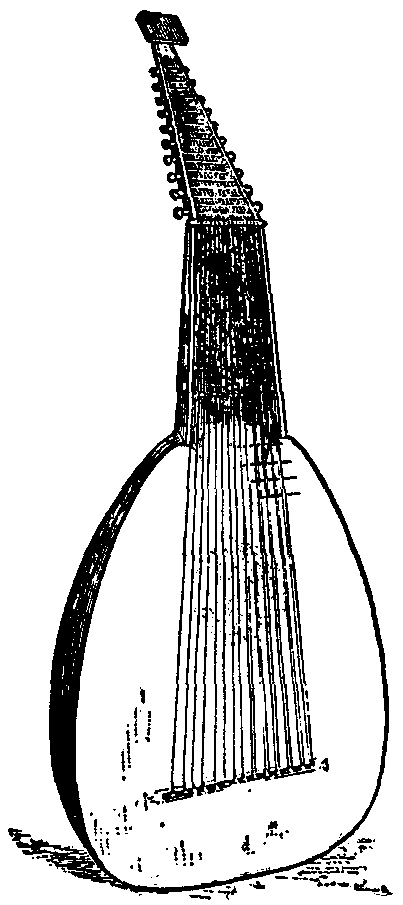
The Britannica Lute

Wilson studied the lute at the Royal College of Music in London with Diana Poulton. He has performed widely in Great Britain and abroad, as a soloist and with other prominent musicians and ensembles, such as Michael Chance, Fretwork and The Hilliard Ensemble.

A frequent guest on television and radio, Wilson has recorded numerous CDs for various recording companies. His consistent duo partner over the years has been the lutenist and singer Shirley Rumsey, with whom he co-directs the ensemble “Kithara”.

== Selected recordings ==
- Fantasia de mon Triste: Lute Music of Francesco da Milano, Vincenzo Capirola and Francesco Spinacino (Hyperion, 1987 / Metronome, 1997)
- Vihuela Music of the Spanish Renaissance (Virgin Classics, 1990)
- Rosa (Elizabethian Lute Music) (Virgin Classics, 1991)
- Dowland: The First Booke of Songes, with Rufus Müller, tenor (Decca, 1993)
- Elizabethan & Jacobean Lute Songs, with Michael Chance, countertenor (Chandos, 1993)
- Francesco Canova da Milano: Lute Music (Naxos, 1994)
- La Magdalena, Lute Music in Renaissance France (Virgin, 1995)
- O Sweet Woods the Delight of Solitarienesse: Songs and Sonnets of John Donne and Philip Sidney, with Paul Agnew, tenor (Metronome, 1995)
- Flow My Teares: John Dowland Songs Volume 1, with Paul Agnew, tenor (Metronome, 1995)
- In Darknesse let me dwell: John Dowland Songs Volume 2, with Paul Agnew, tenor (Metronome, 1996)
- Milán, Narváez: Music for Vihuela (Naxos, 1996)
- Dall'Aquila / Da Crema: Ricercars / Intabulations / Dances (Naxos, 1996)
- Antony Holborne, Thomas Robinson: Pavans & Galliards (Naxos, 1998)
- Early Venetian Lute Music (Naxos, 1999)
- Nicholas Lanier: Hero and Leander with Paul Agnew, tenor (Metronome, 1999)
- John Johnson: Lute Music (Naxos, 2003)
