= The Juliet Letters =

Studio album by Elvis Costello and the Brodsky Quartet
- Released: 19 January 1993
- Studios: The Church Studios, North London
- Genres: Classical; chamber music; art pop
- Length: 62:55
- Label: Warner Bros.
- Producers: Brodsky Quartet; Elvis Costello; Kevin Killen

Elvis Costello chronology
| G.B.H. (1991) | The Juliet Letters (1993) | 2½ Years (1993) |

Professional ratings
Review scores
| Source | Rating |
|---|---|
| AllMusic | 3/5 stars |
| Robert Christgau | (dud) |
| The Encyclopedia of Popular Music | 3/5 stars |
| NME | 8/10 |
| Rolling Stone | 4/5 stars |

The Juliet Letters is a studio album by the British rock singer and songwriter Elvis Costello and British string quartet Brodsky Quartet, released in 1993 by Warner Bros. Records. Costello described the album as "a song sequence for string quartet and voice and it has a title. It's a little bit different. It's not a rock opera. It's a new thing." The Juliet Letters is considered a song cycle. It peaked at No. 18 on the UK Albums Chart, and at No. 125 on the Billboard 200.

== Content ==
Costello first encountered the Brodsky Quartet in 1989, a performance at the Queen Elizabeth Hall of the entire cycle of string quartets by Dmitri Shostakovich. They met for the first time in November 1991, to begin work on the concept and execution of this album project. Costello viewed this album as neither his first stab at classical music, nor the Brodsky's first attempt at rock and roll.

With a concept of imaginary letters being sent to an imaginary recipient, Juliet Capulet, all five musicians contributed to the writing of the lyrics as well as the music. No overdubs were made, the album recorded in its entirety live in the studio. One single was released from the album, the track "Jacksons, Monk, and Rowe," although it did not chart in either the United States or the UK.

== Release history ==
The album was released initially on compact disc in 1993. As part of the Rhino Records reissue campaign for Costello's back catalogue from Demon/Columbia and Warners, it was re-released in 2006 with 18 additional tracks on a bonus disc. The bonus disc included additional musicians to Costello and the Brodsky Quartet, with some tracks recorded live at the 1995 Meltdown Festival. This reissue is out of print; the album was reissued again by Universal Music Group after its acquisition of Costello's complete catalogue in 2006. A new edition of the sheet music was released on 15 September 2023, edited by Jacqueline Thomas and Paul Cassidy, published exclusively by Hal Leonard.

== Legacy ==
Stephen Thomas Erlewine of AllMusic deemed it another of the "deliberately noncommercial, non-representative records" that Costello made for Warner Bros., adding "it's not just that he made a record as anti-pop as Mighty Like a Rose, it's that he followed it with a full-fledged classical album." He found it surprising that the label released the album as it "just doesn't fit anywhere", deeming this the album's intriguing feature. "This is a distinctive, unusual affair that, at its best, effectively marries chamber music with Beatlesque art pop."

Naming it Costello's 21st best album, Michael Galluici of Ultimate Classic Rock found it inevitable that Costello would eventually make "a full-scale classical recording" like The Juliet Letters, finding the song cycle to be admirable and "certainly ambitious" but also "a bit boring. He sounds out of place among the cello and violin; likewise, the quartet can't escape its confines when called upon to move outside its genre." Al Shipley of Spin commented that The Juliet Letters is the best of Costello's ventures outside the pop/rock sphere; though noting that the musician's lyrics were inspired by Romeo and Juliet, "Costello writes comfortably in modern diction instead of contorting himself into Shakespearean English. And the tight, economical sound of four instruments suits him almost as if he and the Attractions were playing violin, viola and cello."

== Recordings and performances by other artists ==
Several artists have either recorded or mounted productions of the song cycle. In 2016, The Sacconi Quartet and Jon Boden (former lead singer of the folk group Bellowhead) performed The Juliet Letters in St Martin's Church, Colchester, as part of the Roman River Festival. Voice department faculty of the Berklee College of Music performed the music with a student string quartet in a recital on 18 April 2019.

== Track listing ==
All tracks are written by Declan MacManus, except where noted.

| No. | Title | Writer(s) | Length |
|---|---|---|---|
| 1. | "Deliver Us" | | 0:49 |
| 2. | "For Other Eyes" | MacManus, Paul Cassidy, Ma. Thomas | 2:55 |
| 3. | "Swine" | MacManus, Cassidy | 2:08 |
| 4. | "Expert Rites" | | 2:23 |
| 5. | "Dead Letter" | Cassidy | 2:18 |
| 6. | "I Almost Had a Weakness" | MacManus, Michael Thomas | 3:53 |
| 7. | "Why?" | MacManus, Ian Belton | 1:26 |
| 8. | "Who Do You Think You Are?" | MacManus, Ma. Thomas, Mi. Thomas | 3:28 |
| 9. | "Taking My Life in Your Hands" | MacManus, Jacqueline Thomas, Ma. Thomas, Cassidy | 3:20 |
| 10. | "This Offer Is Unrepeatable" | MacManus, Cassidy, Belton, J. Thomas, Mi. Thomas | 3:12 |
| 11. | "Dear Sweet Filthy World" | MacManus, Belton, Ma. Thomas | 4:17 |
| 12. | "The Letter Home" | MacManus, Belton, Cassidy | 3:10 |
| 13. | "Jacksons, Monk and Rowe" | MacManus, J. Thomas, Mi. Thomas | 3:43 |
| 14. | "This Sad Burlesque" | MacManus, Cassidy | 2:47 |
| 15. | "Romeo's Seance" | MacManus, Ma. Thomas, Mi. Thomas | 3:32 |
| 16. | "I Thought I'd Write to Juliet" | | 4:07 |
| 17. | "Last Post" | Mi. Thomas, traditional | 2:24 |
| 18. | "The First to Leave" | | 4:59 |
| 19. | "Damnation's Cellar" | | 3:25 |
| 20. | "The Birds Will Still Be Singing" | | 4:27 |
| Total length: | | | 62:55 |

2006 Rhino rerelease bonus disc
| No. | Title | Writer(s) | Length |
|---|---|---|---|
| 1. | "She Moved Through the Fair" (from the album Lament by the Brodsky Quartet) | traditional arr. Cassidy | 4:46 |
| 2. | "Pills and Soap" (live at the Meltdown Festival, Queen Elizabeth Hall, 28 June 1995) | MacManus arr. Cassidy | 4:37 |
| 3. | "King of the Unknown Sea" (live at the Meltdown Festival, Queen Elizabeth Hall, 28 June 1995) | M. Thomas | 3:51 |
| 4. | "Skeleton" (live at the Meltdown Festival, Queen Elizabeth Hall, 28 June 1995) | M. Thomas | 4:54 |
| 5. | "More Than Rain" (from Live at New York Town Hall) | Tom Waits | 3:25 |
| 6. | "God Only Knows" (from Live at New York Town Hall) | Brian Wilson | 4:45 |
| 7. | "They Didn't Believe Me" (from Live at New York Town Hall) | Jerome Kern | 4:01 |
| 8. | "O Mistress Mine" (with John Harle, from the album Terror & Magnificence by John Harle) | Harle | 4:03 |
| 9. | "Come Away, Death" (with John Harle, from the album Terror & Magnificence by John Harle) | Harle | 4:30 |
| 10. | "Put Away Forbidden Playthings" (live at the Meltdown Festival with Fretwork, Queen Elizabeth Hall, 1 July 1995) | | 4:12 |
| 11. | "Can She Excuse My Wrongs" (live at the Meltdown Festival with Fretwork and The Composers Ensemble, Queen Elizabeth Hall, 28 June 1995) | John Dowland | 4:05 |
| 12. | "Fire Suite 1" (with Roy Nathanson & Cyrus Chestnut) | Nathanson | 5:29 |
| 13. | "Fire Suite 3" (with Roy Nathanson, from Fire at Keaton's Bar & Grill) | Nathanson | 3:19 |
| 14. | "Fire Suite Reprise" (with Roy Nathanson, from Fire at Keaton's Bar & Grill) | Nathanson | 2:39 |
| 15. | "Gigi" (live at the Meltdown Festival with Bill Frisell. From the album Deep Dead Blue) | Alan Jay Lerner, Frederick Loewe | 4:14 |
| 16. | "Deep Dead Blue" (with Bill Frisell) (Bill Frisell) –" (live at the Meltdown Festival with Bill Frisell. From the album Deep Dead Blue writer16 = Frisell) | | 3:45 |
| 17. | "Upon a Veil of Midnight Blue" (live at the Meltdown Festival with the Punishing Kiss Band, Queen Elizabeth Hall, 28 June 1995) | | 4:36 |
| 18. | "Lost in the Star" (from September Songs: The Music of Kurt Weill) | Kurt Weill | 3:56 |

== Personnel ==
- Elvis Costello – vocal
- Michael Thomas – violin
- Ian Belton – violin
- Paul Cassidy – viola
- Jacqueline Thomas – cello

== Charts ==
Chart performance for The Juliet Letters
| Chart (1993) | Peak position |
|---|---|
| Australian Albums (ARIA) | 106 |
| UK Albums (Official Charts) | 18 |
| US Billboard 200 | 125 |
