= Songs from the Labyrinth =

Studio album by Sting
- Released: 10 October 2006
- Genres: Classical; Renaissance
- Length: 48:27
- Label: Deutsche Grammophon
- Producers: Sting; Edin Karamazov

Sting chronology
Sacred Love (2003)	Songs from the Labyrinth (2006)	If on a Winter's Night... (2009)

Professional ratings
Review scores
Source	Rating
AllMusic	3.5/5 stars
Entertainment Weekly	C+
Now	3/5 stars
Rolling Stone	3/5 stars

Songs from the Labyrinth is the eighth studio album by British singer-songwriter Sting. On this album, he collaborates with Bosnian lutenist Edin Karamazov. The album features music by John Dowland (1563–1626), a late Renaissance composer and lutenist. It entered the UK Official Albums Chart at number 24 and reached number 25 on the Billboard 200. The release was a slow seller for a Sting album, his first since 1986's Bring on the Night to fail to break the UK top 10.

The album was released and re-released in several versions: LP vinyl and CD editions with 23 tracks, a CD/DVD edition with 8 tracks on the CD and a DVD documentary, The Journey and the Labyrinth (released in both "CD size" and "DVD size" packaging), and a CD re-release with 26 tracks (including live versions of Sting's own "Fields of Gold" and "Message in a Bottle", originally recorded with The Police). In late August 2013, a "Dowland Anniversary Edition" was released, which includes 32 tracks on one CD (the full original album, six live versions of album tracks and Sting's non-Dowland live songs), as well as a DVD with the original documentary.

== Track listing ==
For the original CD program, the music was that of the 16th century British composer John Dowland, except for "Have You Seen the Bright Lily Grow", a song by Dowland's contemporary Robert Johnson. The 2008 re-release adds two live recordings of Sting-penned songs performed on lutes, as well as a live recording, in the same style, of "Hellhound on My Trail" by another Robert Johnson - the Delta blues musician, and an alternate version of "Have You Seen the Bright Lily Grow". The latter is omitted from the 2013 "Dowland Anniversary Edition" of the album, which, however, includes all of the live recordings. The track list includes readings from a letter by Dowland to Robert Cecil, 1st Earl of Salisbury. The lyrics to many of Dowland's songs are anonymous.

1. "Walsingham" – 0:38 [instrumental]
2. "Can She Excuse My Wrongs" [lyrics attributed to Robert Devereux, 2nd Earl of Essex] – 2:35
3. "Ryght Honorable..." – 0:40 [letter to Robert Cecil, 1st Earl of Salisbury]
4. "Flow My Tears (Lachrimae)" – 4:42
5. "Have You Seen the Bright Lily Grow" – 2:35 [lyrics: Ben Jonson, music: Robert Johnson]
6. "...Then in Time Passing On..." – 0:32 [continuation of letter]
7. "The Battle Galliard" – 3:01
8. "The Lowest Trees Have Tops" [lyrics by Sir Edward Dyer] – 2:16
9. "...And Accordinge as I Desired Ther Cam a Letter..." – 0:55 [continuation of letter]
10. "Fine Knacks for Ladies" – 1:50
11. "...From Thence I Went to Landgrave of Hessen..." – 0:24 [continuation of letter]
12. "Fantasy" – 2:42
13. "Come, Heavy Sleep" – 3:46
14. "Forlorn Hope Fancy" – 3:08
15. "...And from Thence I Had Great Desire to See Italy..." – 0:28 [continuation of letter]
16. "Come Again" – 2:56
17. "Wilt Thou Unkind Thus Reave Me" – 2:40
18. "...After My Departures I Caled to Mynde..." – 0:30 [continuation of letter]
19. "Weep You No More, Sad Fountains" – 2:38
20. "My Lord Willoughby's Welcome Home" – 1:34
21. "Clear or Cloudy" – 2:47
22. "...Men Say That the Kinge of Spain..." – 1:01 [continuation of letter]
23. "In Darkness Let Me Dwell" – 4:12
24. "Flow My Tears [live at St Luke Old Street - bonus track on 2013 "Dowland Anniversary Edition"]
25. "The Lowest Trees Have Tops" [live at St Luke Old Street - bonus track on 2013 "Dowland Anniversary Edition"]
26. "Fantasy" [Edin Karamazov solo, live at St Luke Old Street - bonus track on 2013 "Dowland Anniversary Edition"]
27. "Come Again" [live at St Luke Old Street - bonus track on 2013 "Dowland Anniversary Edition"]
28. "Have You Seen the Bright Lily Grow" [live at St Luke Old Street - bonus track on 2013 "Dowland Anniversary Edition"]
29. "In Darkness Let Me Dwell" [live at St Luke Old Street - bonus track on 2013 "Dowland Anniversary Edition"]
30. "Hellhound on My Trail" [ Robert Johnson ] [live at St Luke Old Street - bonus track on re-release and on 2013 "Dowland Anniversary Edition"]
31. "Fields of Gold" – 3:34 [Sting] [live at St Luke Old Street - bonus track on re-release and on 2013 "Dowland Anniversary Edition"]
32. "Message in a Bottle" – 5:40 [Sting] [live at St Luke Old Street - bonus track on re-release and on 2013 "Dowland Anniversary Edition"]
- The 2008 re-release features an alternate version of "Have You Seen the Bright Lily Grow", as track 26, but does not include the six live versions of Dowland songs.

== Related live album and documentary ==
Disc 1: CD

1. "Flow My Tears (Lachrimae)"
2. "The Lowest Trees Have Tops"
3. "Fantasy"
4. "Come Again"
5. "Have You Seen the Bright Lily Grow"
6. "In Darkness Let Me Dwell"
7. "Hellhound on My Trail" [a Robert Johnson cover]
8. "Message in a Bottle" [written by Sting; originally recorded by the Police]

Disc 2: DVD documentary with rehearsal and concert footage. The "tracks" listed below are the DVD chapter stops.

1. "Come Again"
2. Project Origin
3. "Can She Excuse My Wrongs"
4. The Lute and the Labyrinth
5. "The Lowest Trees Have Tops"
6. "Flow My Tears"
7. Dowland's Exile
8. "Clear or Cloudy"
9. Political Intrigue
10. "Have You Seen The Bright Lily Grow"
11. "Weep You No More Sad Fountains"
12. "Le Rossignol"
13. Religion
14. Sting and the Lute
15. "Come, Heavy Sleep"
16. "In Darkness Let Me Dwell"

== Charts ==
Chart performance for Songs from the Labyrinth
Chart (2006–07)	Peak position
Austrian Albums (Ö3 Austria)	40
Belgian Albums (Ultratop Flanders)	16
Belgian Albums (Ultratop Wallonia)	38
Canadian Albums (Nielsen SoundScan)	52
Dutch Albums (Album Top 100)	39
French Albums (SNEP)	20
German Albums (Offizielle Top 100)	11
Hungarian Albums (MAHASZ)	32
Italian Albums (FIMI)	7
Polish Albums (ZPAV)	7
Portuguese Albums (AFP)	28
Scottish Albums (Official Charts)	36
Spanish Albums (Promusicae)	50
Swedish Albums (Sverigetopplistan)	30
Swiss Albums (Schweizer Hitparade)	31
US Billboard 200	25
US Top Classical Albums (Billboard)	1
US Indie Store Album Sales (Billboard)	11
US Top Traditional Classical Albums (Billboard)	1

Chart (2006)	Peak position
UK Albums Chart	24
European Top 100 Albums	12
US Comprehensive Albums	25
US Top Internet Albums	6
US Top Digital Albums	9

== Certifications ==
Sales certifications for Songs from the Labyrinth
Region	Certification	Certified units/sales
Germany (BVMI)	Gold	100,000^{^}
Italy (FIMI)	Gold	40,000^{*}
Poland (ZPAV)	Gold	10,000^{*}
Russia (NFPF)	Gold	10,000^{*}
United States	—	268,000
^{*} Sales figures based on certification alone.^{^} Shipments figures based on certification alone.
