= John Johnson (composer) =

English lutenist and composer (c1545–1594)

John Johnson (c. 1545 – 1594) was an English lutenist, composer of songs and lute music, attached to the court of Queen Elizabeth I. He was the father of the lutenist and composer Robert Johnson.

== Discography ==
The lutenist Lynda Sayce has recorded a disc of works by John Johnson and his son. Two pieces "Pavan" and "Galliard" have been recorded by Julian Bream and John Williams. Christopher Wilson and Shirley Rumsey have made a recording on the Naxos label of John Johnson's lute music. A dozen pieces by Johnson were also recorded by lutenist and theorbist Yavor Genov in his album Orpheus Anglorum (Brilliant Classics, 2018). The group Saraband, with Susanna Pell and Jacob Herringman, includes two pieces by Johnson on their 2016 CD "Twenty waies upon the bels.'
