= Air (music) =

Song-like vocal or instrumental composition

An air (Italian: aria; also air in French) is a song-like vocal or instrumental composition. The term can also be applied to the interchangeable melodies of folk songs and ballads. It is a variant of the musical song form often referred to (in opera, cantata and oratorio) as aria.

== English lute ayres ==
Lute airs were first produced in the royal court of England toward the end of the 16th century and enjoyed considerable popularity until the 1620s. Probably based on Italian monody and French air de cour, they were solo songs, occasionally with more (usually three) parts, accompanied on a lute. (p. 306). Their popularity began with the publication of John Dowland's (1563–1626) First Booke of Songs or Ayres (1597). His most famous airs include "Come again", "Flow, my tears", "I saw my Lady weepe", and "In darkness let me dwell". The genre was further developed by Thomas Campion (1567–1620) whose Books of Airs (1601) (co-written with Philip Rosseter) contains over 100 lute songs and was reprinted four times in the 1610s. Although this printing boom died out in the 1620s, ayres continued to be written and performed and were often incorporated into court masques. (p. 309).

== Baroque and classical airs ==
By the 18th century, composers wrote airs for instrumental ensembles without a voice. These were song-like, lyrical pieces, often movements in a larger composition. Johann Sebastian Bach composed two of the best-known airs: the second movement of his Suite No. 3 in D major, BWV 1068, which August Wilhelmj arranged for violin and piano as Air on the G String; and the theme of his Goldberg Variations, BWV 988. Airs also appear in the Partitas for keyboard BWV 828 in D major and BWV 830 in E minor. The fifth movement of George Frideric Handel's Suite in F Major, HWV 348, part of Handel's Water Music collection, is another frequently performed air.

== See also ==
- Aria
- Orchestral Suites (Bach)
- Air on the G String
