= Weep, o mine eyes =

"Weep, o mine eyes" is one of the most famous madrigals of the English composer John Bennet. It is written for four vocal parts and was published in his first collection, Madrigalls to Fovre Voyces, in 1599. The composition is a homage to John Dowland, being partly based on Dowland's most famous piece, "Flow, my tears".
