= I Saw My Lady Weepe =

I Saw My Lady Weepe performed.

"I Saw My Lady Weep" (the composer used the Early Modern spelling "weepe") is a lute song from The Second Book of Songs by Renaissance lutenist and composer John Dowland. It is the first song in the Second Book and is dedicated to Anthony Holborne. It is an example of Dowland's use of chromaticism.

== Composition ==
While composing "I Saw My Lady Weepe", Dowland was influenced by what has been referred to as the "Elizabethan Melancholy" or "Cult of Darkness." "Flow my tears", the song that follows it, and other songs in the Second Booke also show this influence. There is also a song by Morley called "I Saw My Lady Weeping".

At a time when poets and composers were becoming increasingly interested in the problems of affective writing, grief, melancholy and despair were welcomed because they provided an opportunity for the exploitation of new techniques. If Elizabethan composers tended to choose lyrics which express simple, stylized emotions this is because they were interested in the transmission, not of ideas, but of feelings…this was only possible within the framework of a familiar poetic convention in which emotions were not complex, but followed well-worn paths. Dowland's songs are no exception to this rule.

— Robin Headlam Wells, Early Music, Vol. 13, No. 4. November 1985 pp. 514–528

Robin Headlam Wells stated that Dowland's songs follow this convention about transmitting feelings. According to Wells, the subject of the song is the power of the lady's beauty—or in other words the overriding power of female beauty, whether spiritual or physical. This idea of power coming from a woman's beauty is one that is quite common in the poetry of the Elizabethan era.

The poetry of "I Saw My Lady Weepe" breaks with some of the conventions of its day in its treatment of the lady's beauty and charms. Rather than grouping them together, Dowland presents a paradox in which the lady herself becomes more beautiful than her sorrow; at this time, it was the emotion itself that was generally considered to be the beauty or charm, rather than the human subject itself. Like most examples of this type, it ends with an ironic admission of the power of love has to conquer over reason. The composer can then take liberties regarding the theoretical nature of the music to which he sets the text. The joining of the text with the music enhances the sense of the melancholy that pervades the verse of the time and through this merger, the music of the epoch takes on this same sense.

=== Relation to "Flow My Tears" ===
It has been asserted that "I Saw My Lady Weepe" is not complete in and of itself. Rather, it is dependent upon the song that directly succeeds it, "Flow My Tears", to be complete. In comparison to the other lute songs in the Second Booke, "I Saw My Lady Weepe" ends on the fifth; looking at the chordal structure, the final note of the sung line is the leading-tone. It is the only work that ends this way in the book, when theoretically, it should resolve back to the tonic. This ending on the fifth is what leads Leech-Wilkinson to assert the necessity of "I Saw My Lady Weepe" being concluded by "Flow My Tears", because "Flow My Tears" provides the necessary resolution, by beginning on the tonic note of "I Saw My Lady Weepe". Looking at "I Saw My Lady Weepe" on its own, the relationship created by ending on the fifth "...might seem easily explicable in traditional modal terms, the harmonic language of the song cannot sensibly be read as mode 4 (a-a', but with the final on e)." It is the movement within the song, leading away from a sense of the tonic along with the aforementioned final of the sung line on the seventh, that brings questions about how to analyze the work because ending on the seventh within mode 4 seems unallowable and because of this, the song is unresolved whether viewed as modal or tonal. When viewed in relation to Wells' idea of the melancholy, it may begin to appear these two songs are not a pair, as Leech-Wilkinson suggests, but rather that the sense of a need for resolution left behind at the end of "I Saw My Lady Weepe" could be intentional on the part of the composer, in order to leave the listener with a deeper sense of the emotions of the work.

One of the other devices used by Dowland suggesting that the compositions are a pair is his use of syncopation at the end of the last phrase of "I Saw My Lady Weepe". The syncopation disrupts the sense of rhythm within the song, and the addition of what could be considered extra notes leading to a necessary textual repeat leaves the rhythm also wanting a metrical resolution; this resolution is given by the opening material of the following song.

...the melodic ascent which closes I saw my lady weep, e' f' g' a', pausing on the neighbour-note g' sharp as a pivot between the two songs, is answered at the start of Flow my tears by the complementary descent a' g' f' e', which is itself both anticipated in augmentation in the bass at the end of I saw my lady weep… and echoed immediately at the beginning of Flow my teares in the lowest line of the lute.

— Daniel Leech-Wilkinson, Early Music, Vol. 19, No. 2. May 1991 pp. 227, 229–33

This melodic joining of the songs lends itself to the idea that "I Saw My Lady Weepe" may have been composed as an introduction to "Flow My Tears". This idea is built upon the knowledge that "Flow My Tears" is a setting of an earlier Dowland pavane for lute, while, according to Leech-Wilkinson, "I Saw My Lady Weepe" most likely originated as a song. Leech-Wilkinson also asserts that it is possible that "I saw my Lady weepe" is in some ways a continuation of the dedication of the Second Booke to the Countess of Bedford. However, it seems unlikely given that "I Saw My Lady Weepe" is dedicated to Anthony Holborne.

== Lyrics ==
I saw my lady weep,
And Sorrow proud to be advanced so,
In those fair eyes where all perfections keep.
Her face was full of woe,
But such a woe believe me as wins more hearts,
Than Mirth can do with her enticing charms.

Sorrow was there made fair,
And Passion wise, tears a delightful thing,
Silence beyond all speech a wisdom rare.
She made her sighs to sing,
And all things with so sweet a sadness move,
As made my heart at once both grieve and love.

O fairer than aught else
The world can show, leave off in time to grieve.
Enough, enough, (enough, enough,) your joyful looks excels.
Tears kill the heart, believe;
O strive not to be excellent in woe,
Which only breeds your beauty's overthrow.
