= Musical Antiquarian Society =

19th-century music-publishing society

The Musical Antiquarian Society was a British society established in 1840. It published, during seven years, 19 volumes of choral music from the 16th and 17th centuries.

== History ==
The society was established in 1840 "for the publication of scarce and valuable works by the early English composers", and started publications in November of that year. Examples of old English melody had been reproduced in A Collection of National English Airs, then recently completed, and this society was designed to provide examples of the English school of harmony in and after the madrigalian era.

As motets, madrigals, and other choral music were originally published only in separate parts, it became necessary, for this object, to reproduce them in score. The separate parts were difficult to obtain, and not in all cases correct; the editors had therefore a considerable amount of labour, and occasionally of thought, in making the scores. Nevertheless, the duties were cheerfully undertaken by eminent musicians of the time, some of whom added biographies of the composers, or other interesting introductory matter, all without remuneration, as the object was a national one.

Nineteen works were published, in large folio, and to these were added sixteen corresponding folios of compressed scores by Professor G. A. Macfarren. These were undertaken by the publisher on his own responsibility, with a view of increasing the subscription list. The council of the society had decided against the addition of accompaniments under the vocal scores. Besides the editors, there were many eminent musicians who assisted on the council and at the rehearsal of each work, being then occasionally called upon to advise in cases of doubtful notes.

The society lasted seven years, and in its second year numbered nearly a thousand members, but they gradually fell away, chiefly alleging as reasons that the works were more fitted for societies than for private families, in which there are rarely a sufficient number of voices; and, secondly, that the books occupied too much space. The annual subscription was one pound, and the works were supplied to the members at prime cost.

== Publications ==
The nineteen works issued by the society were:

1. A Mass for 5 voices, by William Byrd. Edited by E. F. Rimbault.
2. The first set of Madrigals by John Wilbye. Edited by James Turle.
3. Madrigals and Motets for 5 voices, by Orlando Gibbons. Edited by Sir George Smart.
4. Dido and Æneas, a tragic opera by Henry Purcell. Edited by G. A. Macfarren.
5. The first set of Ballets for 5 voices, by Thomas Morley. Edited by E. F. Rimbault.
6. Book I of Cantiones sacræ for 5 voices, by William Byrd. Edited by W. Horsley.
7. Bonduca, a tragedy by Henry Purcell. Edited by E. F. Rimbault.
8. The first set of Madrigals by Thomas Weelkes. Edited by Edward J. Hopkins.
9. Fantasies in 8 parts composed for Viols, by Orlando Gibbons. Edited by E. F. Rimbault.
10. King Arthur, an opera by Henry Purcell. Edited by Professor Edward Taylor.
11. The whole Book of Psalms with their wonted tunes, in 4 parts, as published by Thomas Este. Edited by E. F. Rimbault.
12. The first set of Songs by John Dowland. Edited by William Chappell.
13. Airs or Fa las by John Hilton. Edited by Joseph Warren.
14. A collection of Anthems by M. Este, T. Ford, Weelkes, and Bateson. Edited by E. F. Rimbault.
15. Madrigals by John Bennet. Edited by E. J. Hopkins.
16. The second set of Madrigals by John Wilbye. Edited by George William Budd.
17. The first set of Madrigals by Thomas Bateson. Edited by E. F. Rimbault.
18. Parthenia, or the first music ever printed for the Virginals, by W. Byrd, John Bull, and Orlando Gibbons. Edited by E. F. Rimbault.
19. Ode composed for St. Cecilia's Day by Henry Purcell. Edited by E. F. Rimbault.

== Council members ==
Among members of the council not included in the above list were Sir John Goss, Sir W. Sterndale Bennett, Sir Henry Bishop, Henry Smart, George Hogarth, William Hawes, Charles Lucas, Charles Neate, John Barnett, Tom Cooke, George Cooper, W. H. Callcott, J. Blackbourn, W. Bayley, E. Hawkins, I. Moscheles, and others. E. F. Rimbault acted throughout as honorary secretary, and William Chappell, the projector of the society, acted for about five years as treasurer and manager of the publications. He was then succeeded by his younger brother, Thomas P. Chappell.
