= Fretwork (band) =

English consort of viols

- Genres: Renaissance; Baroque; Contemporary
- Years active: since 1985
- Labels: Virgin Classics; Harmonia Mundi; Signum Classics
- Members: Emily Ashton; Emilia Benjamin; Richard Boothby; Joanna Levine; Jonathan Rees; Sam Stadlen
- Past members: Richard Campbell; Wendy Gillespie; Julia Hodgson; William Hunt; Susanna Pell
- Website: fretwork.co.uk

Fretwork is a British consort of viols, established in 1985. It specialises in English music for viol consort from approximately the time of William Byrd to that of Henry Purcell, but also performs Renaissance and contemporary repertoire.

== History ==
The group was formed in 1985 and received financial support from the Arts Council of Great Britain. Its first performance was in the Wigmore Hall in 1986. In 1999 the group consisted of Richard Boothby, Richard Campbell, Wendy Gillespie, Julia Hodgson, William Hunt and Susanna Pell. In 2023 the members were listed on the website as Emily Ashton, Emilia Benjamin, Richard Boothby, Joanna Levine, Jonathan Rees and Sam Stadlen. Among those who have performed with the group are the singers Catherine Bott, James Bowman and Michael Chance, the instrumentalists Paul Nicholson and Christopher Wilson, and the Red Byrd vocal ensemble.

The group has published a number of editions of music for consort of viols and also a book by David Pinto on the consort and dance music of William Lawes.

== Recognition ==
- 1997: French Grand Prix du Disque for Lachrimae, or Seaven Teares by John Dowland
- 2009: Gramophone Award for 'Purcell: Complete Fantazias' (by Henry Purcell) on Harmonia Mundi
- 2016: Royal Philharmonic Society 'Chamber Music & Song' Award

== Recordings ==
- In Nomine, 1987
- Heart's Ease, 1988
- Armada, 1988
- Cries and Fancies by Orlando Gibbons, 1989
- Night's Black Bird by John Dowland and William Byrd, 1989
- Goe nightly cares by John Dowland and William Byrd, 1990
- Lachrimae by John Dowland, 1990
- For ye Violls by William Lawes, 1991
- Music for Viols, 1992
- A Play of Passion, 1992
- The English Viol, 1994 (compilation album)
- William Byrd: The Complete Consort Music by William Byrd, 1994
- Henry Purcell: The Fantazias and In Nomines by Henry Purcell, 1995
- Concord is conquer'd by William Lawes, 1995
- Matthew Locke: Consort of Fower Parts by Matthew Locke, 1996
- The Mirrour and Wonder of his Age by John Jenkins, 1996
- Sit Fast, 1997
- Celestiall Witchcraft, 1999
- Missa 'Mater Christi sanctissima' by John Taverner, 2000
- The Hidden Face by John Tavener and John Taverner, 2001
- Harmonice Musices Odhecaton compiled by Ottaviano Petrucci, 2001
- The Art of Fugue by J.S. Bach, 2002
- Above the Starrs by Thomas Tomkins, 2003
- Im Maien by Ludwig Senfl, 2004
- Consort Songs by William Byrd, 2004
- Bach: Alio Modo by Johann Sebastian Bach, 2005
- Agricola: Chansons by Alexander Agricola & Fabrice Fitch, 2006
- Birds on Fire: Jewish Music for Viols, music by Thomas Lupo, Orlando Gough etc., 2008
- English Music for Viols (a 5-CD set of previous recordings of works by Purcell, Lawes, Locke & Jenkins), 2008
- Purcell Complete Fantazias The fantazias & In Nomines by Henry Purcell of 1680, 2009
- The Silken Tent, music by Alexander Goehr, William Byrd, Michael Nyman, Henry Purcell, Claude Debussy etc., 2009
- J. S. Bach: The Goldberg Variations, arranged for six viols by Richard Boothby , 2011
- The World Encompassed music by Orlando Gough, Robert Parsons, Robert White with Simon Callow, narrator, 2017
- Consort Anthems by Orlando Gibbons, with the Magdalena Consort & His Majesties Cornets & Sackbuts, 2017
- John Jenkins Complete four-part consort music, 2018
- If - Music by Michael Nyman & Henry Purcell with Iestyn Davies, 2019
- In Nomine II - In Nomines by Nico Muhly, Parsons, Ferrabosco and others, 2019
- In Chains of Gold Volume Two, 2020
- An Elizabethan Christmas with Helen Charlston. Music by Byrd, Weelkes, Holborn and others, 2021
- Lamento - German music for alto and viols with Iestyn Davies, 2021
- Matthew Locke - The Flatt Consort, 2022
- Fantasia - The consort music of Thomas Lupo, 2022
- Matthew Locke - The Little Consort, 2022
- Tom & Will - music by William Byrd and Thomas Weelkes with The Kings Singers, 2023
