= Cadwgan Delynor =

Welsh musician

Cadwgan Delynor (fl. late 14th / early 15th century) was a Welsh musician.

Delynor's works include the airs; 'Awen Oleuddydd' ('The Daylight Muse'), 'Cog Wenllian' ('Gwenllian's Cuckoo'), 'Oerloes Goeden' ('The Sapling'), and 'Owiai Gywydd' ('The Warbler's Ode').
