= Lynda Sayce =

Lynda Sayce is a British lutenist and theorbo player, known also as a scholar of musical history and a writer on the history of the lute and theorbo.

Brought up in Sandwell where she trained in the youth orchestra Originally trained as a flautist, she read music at St Hugh's College, Oxford, studied lute with Jakob Lindberg at the Royal College of Music and played continuo with Nigel North. She has performed and recorded with many leading ensembles including Charivari Agréable, Musica Antiqua of London, The King's Consort and the Dowland Consort, playing the cittern and bandora in addition to the lute (and related instruments the theorbo and mandora).

As a continuo player, she has performed for John Eliot Gardiner and the Monteverdi Orchestra, Andrew Parrott and the Taverner Players, the Academy of Ancient Music, and the English National Opera. In recent times she has also been exploring the repertoire of the early guitar, partly in consequence of having chanced upon a fine 1860s instrument in a charity shop.

== Discography ==
According to her website, she has performed on more than 100 commercial recordings. Her first solo recording, of lute pieces by John and Robert Johnson, was issued on Dervorguilla Records in 1992.
