= My Lord Chamberlain, His Galliard =

16th-century composition for the lute

"My Lord Chamberlain, His Galliard (an invention for two to play upon one lute)" is a piece by John Dowland for the lute. It was printed in his First Booke of Songes or Ayres (London, 1597). The Lord Chamberlain at the time of publication was George Carey, 2nd Baron Hunsdon who with his wife Elizabeth was the dedicatee of the First Book.

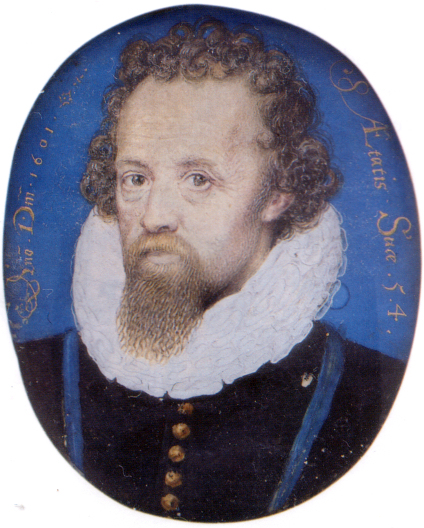
George Carey

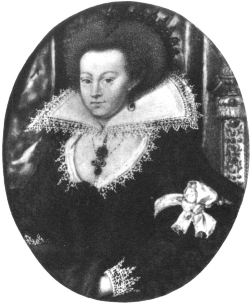
Elizabeth Carey

Like many of the compositions in the First Book, the piece uses a dance form, the galliard. The work's description is the first use of the term "invention" referring to a musical work in English. It is the only lute duet, aside from those by Thomas Robinson, published in England. According to Spring, the work "allows the possibility of an intimate embrace" between the two players, who must sit one upon the other's lap. Rather than a being romantic duet, Thurston Dart, who reworked Fellowes' edition of the First Book, suggested that the piece might have been played by father and son, as he concluded that it is easier if one of the players is a child.

== Bibliography ==
- Spring, Matthew: The Lute in Britain: A History of the instrument and its music. Oxford University Press, Oxford, 2001.
- Caldwell, John (2001). "Invention". In Sadie, Stanley; Tyrrell, John (eds.). The New Grove Dictionary of Music and Musicians (2nd ed.). London: Macmillan Publishers. ISBN 978-1-56159-239-5.
