= John Bennet (composer) =

Composer of the English Madrigal School

John Bennet (c. 1575 – after 1614) was a composer of the English Madrigal School. Little is known for certain of Bennet's life, but his first collection of madrigals was published in 1599.

== Life ==
Bennet's madrigals include "All creatures now" as well as "Weep, o mine eyes". The latter is an homage to John Dowland, using part of Dowland's most famous piece, "Flow, my tears", also known in its pavane form as Lachrymae antiquae. Bennet's life is mostly undocumented. Bennet did however leave behind evidence that his impact is great. Bennet dedicated his madrigal volume, These First Fruits of My Simple Skill the Endeavors of a Young Wit to Ralph Assheton in 1599. Assheton held civic office in both Lancashire and Cheshire, he was dedicated as a token for favours received. It seems probable, therefore, that Bennet came from the north-west of England, and was born about 1575 to 1580.

=== Early life ===
Bennet was born into a prosperous family and received his first exposure to music as a choirboy and advanced in music by his early twenties, he produced the Volume of 17: Madrigals for Four Voices. At around that same time, Bennet fashioned four psalm settings and a prayer for the 1599 Barley's psalter. Though Bennet's style showed the influence of Wilbye, Weelkes, and Dowland, his greatest debt was to Thomas Morley.

== Social status ==
It is likely that Bennet had strong connections in high places in English society: many of his madrigals were written for festive occasions held at court or in private residences of wealthy patrons in London. His madrigal, "Eliza, her name gives honour" was one of several madrigals written for the feted guest at a celebration, in this case Queen Elizabeth I. At such events, choirboys from the Chapel Royal were typically the featured performers.

== Composition style ==
John Bennet composed chiefly in the English madrigal style. He also composed several religious songs for church choral performances. His music shows a great deal of influence from the works of Thomas Morley. Bennet did not borrow musical ideas from earlier settings but he was knowledgeable about the latest trends of English madrigal during the time he was alive.

== Works ==
Madrigals

"Weep, o mine eyes"

"All creatures now"

- Madrigalls to Fovre Voyces (Madrigals for Four Voices) (London, 1599) [17 madrigals]
  - I wander up and down
  - Weep silly soul disdained [AKA: Mourn silly soul disdained]
  - So gracious is thy sweet self [AKA: So lovely is thy dear self]
  - Let go, why do you stay me [AKA: My dear, why do you stay]
  - Come, shepherds, follow me
  - I languish to complain me
  - Sing out, ye nymphs [AKA: Sing loud, ye nymphs; Shout loud, ye nymphs]
  - Thirsis, sleepest thou
  - Ye restless thoughts
  - When as I glance [AKA: When as I looked]
  - Cruel unkind my heart thou hast bereft me
  - O sleep, o sleep fond fancy
  - Weep, o mine eyes [AKA: Flow, o my tears]
  - Since neither tunes of joy
  - O grief, where shall poor grief
  - O sweet grief, o sweet sighs
  - Rest, now Amphion
- Six madrigals (all for four voices) by Bennet were published in Thomas Ravenscroft's A Briefe Discourse (London, 1614)
  - A hunts vp (The hunt is up)
  - For the hearne and ducke [AKA: Lure, falconers, lure! (Low'r, falc'ners, low'r), a hunting madrigal; Hunting for the hearn and duck; The Falconers' Song]
  - The Elues Daunce (The Elves' Dance)
  - Three Fooles
  - The Seruant of his Mistris (The Servant of his Mistress) [AKA: My Mistress is as fair as fine; The lover to his mistress]
  - Their Wedlocke (A Borgens a borgen, che hard long agoe)
- "All creatures now are merry minded", for 5 voices [published in The Triumphs of Oriana, 1601]
- "Round about in a fair ring", for 4 voices [published 1614]
- "My mistress is as fair as fine", for 4 voices [AKA: The Lover to His Mistress] (different setting than in Ravenscroft's A Briefe Discourse)

Consort songs

- "Eliza, her name gives honour"
- "Venus' birds"

Anthems

- "O be joyful in the Lord all ye lands" (Psalm 100), soloist, chorus and organ
- "O God of gods", in 5 parts
- "O God of gods o king of kings", in 4 parts
- "Thou art, o Lord, my strength and stay" (Psalm 28) [in Richard Langdon's Divine Harmony, 1774]

Psalms [all published in The Whole Booke of Psalmes, ed. Thomas Ravenscroft, 1621]

- "My soul praise thou the Lord allways" (Psalm 146)
- "Oft they, now Israel may say" (Psalm 129)
- "O Lord how joyful is the king" (Psalm 21)
- "O Lord I put my trust in thee" (Psalm 31)
- "Thou heard that Israel dost keepe" (Psalm 80)
