= William Chappell (writer) =

19th-century English writer

William Chappell (20 November 1809 – 20 August 1888) was an English writer on music, a partner in the London musical firms of Chappell & Co. and, later, Cramer & Co.

== Biography ==
He was born in London on 20 November 1809. His father, Samuel Chappell, soon after the son's birth, entered into partnership with Johann Baptist Cramer and F. T. Latour, and opened a music publishing business at 124 New Bond Street. In 1826, he became sole partner, and in 1830 was established at 50 New Bond Street, where he died in December 1834.

William, his eldest son, then managed the business for his mother until 1843. Chappell began the study of English folk-tunes and ballads. In 1838, he issued his first work, A Collection of National English Airs, consisting of Ancient Song, Ballad, and Dance Tunes, in two volumes, one containing 245 tunes, the second some elucidatory remarks and an essay on English minstrelsy. The airs were harmonised by Macfarren, Dr. Crotch, and Wade; only Macfarren's were adequate. Wade's being too slight, and Crotch's too elaborate. Chappell was the first who seriously studied traditional English tunes.

In 1840, Chappell became a fellow of the Society of Antiquaries. He took an active part in the formation of the Percy Society, for which he edited Johnson's Crown Garland of Golden Roses. He projected the Musical Antiquarian Society, to publish and perform early English compositions, and established madrigal-singing by a small choir at his premises in New Bond Street. Most of the leading English musicians joined the society, which began publishing in 1841; Chappell acted as treasurer and manager of the publications for about five years.

He edited the twelfth volume, Dowland's First Booke of Songes or Ayres, but inexplicably omitted Dowland's accompaniments. The society's publications were in cumbersome and expensive folios, and the members soon fell away until the society dissolved in 1848.

The Chappell family had in 1843 made an arrangement by virtue of which William retired from the business. In 1845, he bought a share in the publishing business of Cramer & Co., which was then called Cramer, Beale, & Chappell. He patiently continued his investigations into antiquarian music, and waited till 1855 before issuing an improved edition of his collection. It was renamed Popular Music of the Olden Time, and arranged in two octavo volumes, letterpress and music interspersed. The tunes were harmonised by Macfarren. Immense learning and research are displayed throughout the work, which at once became the recognised authority upon the subject. It suffers from Chappell's prejudices against Scotland and everything Scottish; and Dr. Burney, who did not appreciate Elizabethan madrigals, is repeatedly attacked with unjustifiable exaggeration, notably in the preface. A new posthumous edition, edited by Harry Ellis Wooldridge, appeared in 1893, with the title Old English Popular Music, and the tunes re-harmonised on the basis of the mediæval modes; this edition is practically a new work. In 1861, Chappell retired from the firm of Cramer & Co.

He suffered from writers' palsy for several years, but eventually recovered. He acted as honorary treasurer of the Ballad Society, for which he edited three volumes of the Roxburgh Ballads (London, 1869 &c. 8vo). He was also an active member, and for a time treasurer, of the Camden Society. He gave most important assistance in the publication of Coussemaker's Scriptores de Musica (4 tom. Paris, 1863–76). The celebrated double canon, Sumer is icumen in, whose existence in a thirteenth-century manuscript is the most inexplicable phenomenon in the history of music, was long studied by Chappell; a facsimile in colours served as the frontispiece of his Popular Music of the Olden Time, and he finally succeeded in identifying the handwriting as the work of Johannes de Fornsete, and in showing that the writer died on 19 January 1239 or 1240.

At the foundation of the Musical Association in 1874, he was appointed a vice-president, and on 6 November 1877, he read a profound and original paper on Music a Science of Numbers. During the latter part of his life he lived mostly at Weybridge, but died at his London residence, 53 Upper Brook Street, on 20 August 1888.
