= Peter Holman =

English conductor and musicologist

Peter Kenneth Holman MBE (born 19 October 1946, in London) is an English conductor and musicologist best known for reviving the music of Purcell and his English contemporaries. Holman, with the ensemble The Parley of Instruments made many of the extensive series of recordings of lesser-known English baroque music on Hyperion Records in that label's English Orpheus series from 1980 to 2010. The ensemble was co-founded in 1979 by Holman and the violinist Roy Goodman. Holman and the ensemble now record on the Chandos Classics label.

Holman was appointed Member of the Order of the British Empire (MBE) in the 2015 New Year Honours for services to early music.

== Publications ==
- Dowland: Lachrimae (1604) 1999
- Henry Purcell 1994
- Life After Death: The Viola Da Gamba in Britain 2010
- From Renaissance to Baroque: change in instruments Jonathan Wainwright, Peter Holman, University of York. Dept. of Music - 2005
- Four and twenty fiddlers: the violin at the English court, 1540-1690 - 1996
- Music in the British Provinces, 1690-1914 Rachel Cowgill, Peter Holman - 2007
- Purcell - 23 articles ed. Peter Holman - 2011
- Terpsichore at 400: Michael Praetorius as a Collector of Dances. The Viola da Gamba Society Journal, Volume Six - 2012. pp. 34–51. online
