= John Windet =

English printer

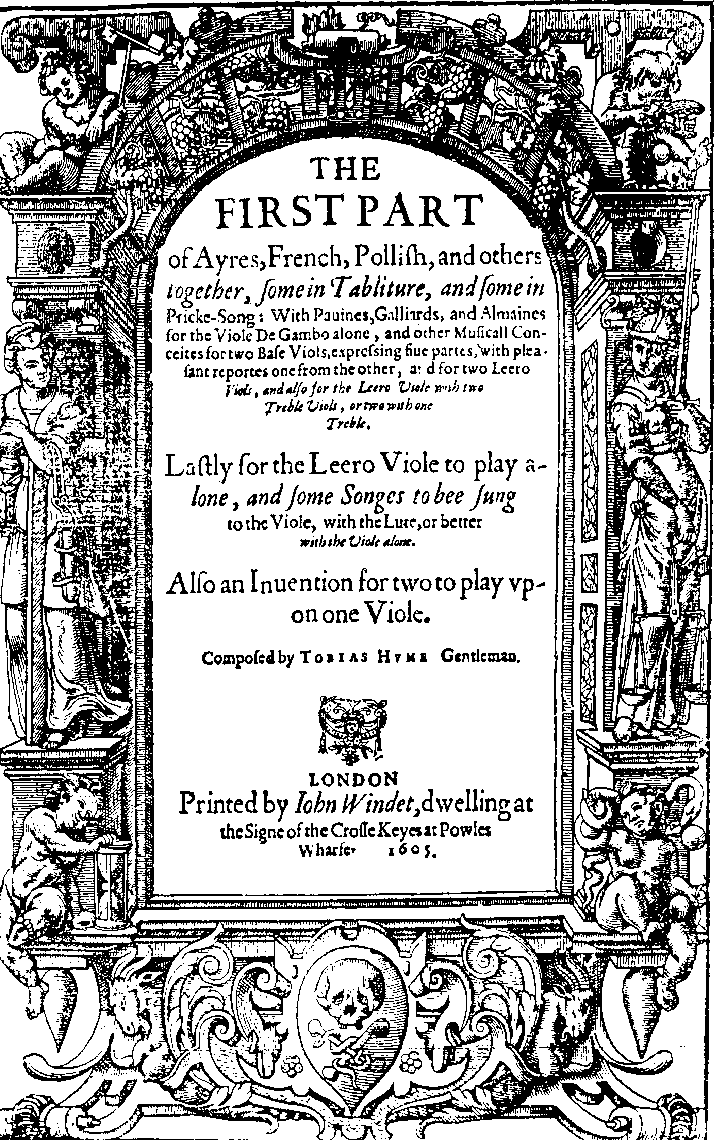
Title page of composer Tobias Hume's First Part of Ayres (1605), which Windet printed

John Windet (fl 1584–1611) was an English printer, notable for his music publications. He was a close business associate of fellow printer John Wolfe. After 1591, Wolfe ceased printing the lucrative metrical psalter of Thomas Sternhold and John Hopkins, and Windet succeeded him in becoming the sole printer of the work for patent-holder Richard Day. At some point, Windet succeeded Wolfe as London's City Printer. Wolfe passed on some of his printing ornaments to Windet after he decided to stop printing and focus solely on publishing in 1594. On Wolfe's death in 1601, Windet was appointed administrator of his estate.

In 1604, Windet printed John Dowland's influential Lachrimae, or Seaven Teares, a collection of the composer's pavans and one of the most important musical works of the era. He also printed all of composer Tobias Hume's known compositions in two compilations—First Part of Ayres (1605) and Captaine Humes Poeticall Musicke (1607). Windet probably needed to use all his skills as a printer to accommodate the unconventional Hume. The First Part of Ayres contains instructions for what may be the earliest examples of pizzicato ("to be plaide with your fingers...your Bow ever in your hand") and col legno ("Drum this with the back of your Bow"), which were probably eccentricities at the time. In "Lesson for two to play upon one Viole" of First Part of Ayres, one of the players must sit in the lap of the other. Windet's other music publications included printings for Robert Jones, John Coprario and Thomas Ford.

On 25 December 1590, Windet took on William Stansby as his apprentice. Six years later, Windet gave Stansby his freedom, and on 7 January 1597, Stansby was admitted as a freeman of the Stationers' Company. Probably lacking in capital, Stansby decided to stay with Windet at his shop at "the Crosse Keys at Powles Wharfe (St Benet Paul's Wharf)". Windet helped Stansby print his first book, The Policy of the Turkish Empire in April 1597. Windet continued printing until his death in either 1610 or 1611, at which point Stansby took over his Cross Keys shop; on 11 September 1611, Stansby inherited 47 of Windet's copyrights.
