= The Second Book of Songs =

Song book by British composer John Dowland circa 1600

The Second Book of Songs (title in Early Modern English: The Second Booke of Songs or Ayres of 2, 4 and 5 parts: with Tableture for the Lute or Orpherian, with the Violl de Gamba) is a book of songs composed by Renaissance composer John Dowland and published in London in 1600. He dedicated it to Lucy Russell, Countess of Bedford.

The book contains 22 songs plus an instrumental number, a "lesson for the Lute and Base Viol, called Dowlands a dew" (his First Book of Songs of 1597 contained 21 songs plus an instrumental number). The music is often described as lute songs, but this is somewhat misleading. The title page offers options regarding the instruments to be used. Also, some songs are appropriate for more than one voice, although compared to the First Book the music is removed from the world of the English madrigal. In the First Book all the songs can be performed in a four-part version.

== Lyrics ==
Many of the lyrics are anonymous. There has been speculation that Dowland wrote some of his own lyrics, but there is not any firm evidence for this. Whoever wrote them, the quality has been recognised as being high.

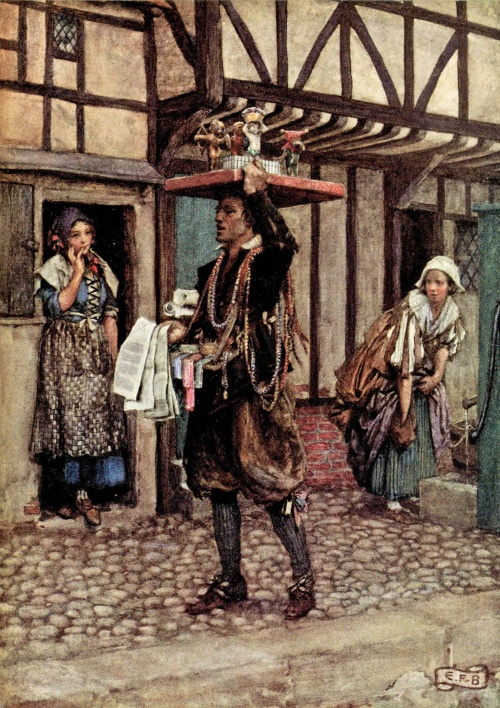

Fine knacks for ladies, in which the anonymous poet takes on the role of a pedlar, has been anthologised as an example of Elizabethan verse, for example in The Norton Anthology of Poetry.

== Publication history ==
In his address to the "courteous reader" at the beginning of the First Book of Songs, Dowland announced his intention to publish more songs. The first book was printed by Peter Short, who had recently become involved in music printing. For the second book, Dowland turned to a different team - the publisher was George Eastland of Fleet Street (an obscure figure who appears to have known the Dowland family) and the printer was Thomas East, an experienced music printer. A fee had to be paid to Thomas Morley, who between 1598 and his death held a printing patent (which can be defined as a type of monopoly or copyright protection in respect of music printing).

On the title-page Dowland is correctly described as lutenist to the King of Denmark. The manuscript was delivered by Mrs Dowland, but as Dowland was living abroad, he was not able to liaise with the printer, and the proofs were read by two composers who were in London at the time, John Wilbye and Edward Johnson.

=== Reception ===
The First Book was a commercial success and was reprinted four times during the composer's lifetime. The Second Book appears to have sold less well than expected, at any rate it was not reprinted by Thomas East. However, it includes songs which have become among the best known among the composer's output.

== Recordings ==
Fine knacks for ladies, one of the better known songs from the Second Book of Songs, sung by Collegium Vocale Bydgoszcz

An early example of a recording of a song from the Second Book is a 78 rpm record by Alfred Deller of Fine knacks for ladies with Desmond Dupré playing guitar. This was recorded at Abbey Road in 1949. In later recordings of this repertoire Deller's accompanist switched to the lute.

== Song titles ==
1. I saw my Lady weepe
2. Flow my tears
3. Sorrow Stay
4. Die not before the day
5. Mourn, day is with darkness fled
6. Time's eldest son, Old Age
7. Then sit thee down
8. When others sing Venite
9. Praise blindness eyes
10. O sweet woods
11. If floods of tears
12. Fine knacks for ladies
13. Now cease my wand'ring eyes
14. Come ye heavy states of night
15. White as lilies was her face
16. Woeful heart
17. A Shepherd in a shade
18. Faction that ever dwells
19. Shall I sue
20. Toss not my soul
21. Clear or cloudy
22. Humour say what mak'st thou here (a Dialogue)
