= Peter Short (printer) =

English printer

Peter Short (died 1603) was an English printer based in London in the later Elizabethan era. He printed several first editions and early texts of Shakespeare's works.

== Career ==
Short became a "freeman" (full member) of the Stationers Company on 1 March 1589, and operated his own business from that year until his death; he was partnered with Richard Yardley until 1593. His shop was at the sign of the star on Bread Street Hill (the southern continuation of Bread Street).

About a third of his titles involved translations from Latin or contemporary European languages. Short began publishing music in 1597; he issued Thomas Morley's A Plaine and Easy Introduction and both Canzonets, Dowland's First Book of Songs, Holborne's Cittharn School, and Hunnis's Seven Sobs. Short used type which was passed on and used by his successors (Humphrey Lownes, James Young).

In an era when the functions of publisher and printer were often largely (though not entirely) separate, Short was primarily a printer and only secondarily a publisher; he printed just over 170 works in his career, and the publishers of about 100 are known. Short likely published a good portion of the others himself.

== Works ==
Apart from Shakespeare's works, Short's most important printing tasks were: the famous 1600 first edition of William Gilbert's De Magnete; the 1601 edition of the Annals of John Stow; and the completion of the fifth edition (1597) of the Acts and Monuments, or Book of Martyrs of John Foxe. He also printed the first edition (1600) of Marlowe's translation of Lucan's Pharsalia for Thomas Thorpe. In music publishing, Short was responsible for printing John Dowland's First Booke of Songes or Ayres, the most successful music anthology of the era, as well as Thomas Morley's important theoretical treatise A Plaine and Easie Introduction to Musicke, both printed in 1597

Regarding Shakespeare, Short printed:

- The first quarto of Henry VI, Part 3 (1595), for publisher Thomas Millington. This was the "bad quarto," the early alternative text of Shakespeare's play known as The True Tragedy of Richard Duke of York.
- The first quarto of Henry IV, Part 1 (1598), for Andrew Wise.
- The second edition of The Rape of Lucrece (1598), for John Harrison. This was the first edition of that poem in octavo rather than quarto format (O1).
- The fifth edition of Venus and Adonis (1599), for William Leake; the third octavo edition (O3).

For Cuthbert Burby, Short printed Palladis Tamia (1598) by Francis Meres, a book that contains an important early reference to Shakespeare and a list of his plays performed up to 1598.

Short printed a few non-Shakespearean play texts as well:

- For Burby, Short printed Q1 and Q2 of The Taming of a Shrew (1594, 1596), the early alternative version of Shakespeare's The Shrew.
- For William Ponsonby, he printed the closet drama Antony (1595), translated from the French of Robert Garnier by the Countess of Pembroke.
- For Simon Waterson, he printed the third, 1598 edition of Samuel Daniel's Cleopatra.
- And for William Holme, Short printed one of the three editions of Jonson's Every Man Out of His Humour that appeared in a single year, 1600.

Short's connection with the Shakespeare canon has led scholars to study his printed output and learn details of the workings of his shop, including the compositors he employed.

== Death ==
After his 1603 death, Short's widow, Emma Short, continued their business, reissuing Dowland´s First Book of Songs; she married Humphrey Lownes, another member of the Stationers Company, in 1604.
