= Consort song =

English song form

A consort song was a characteristic English song form of the late 16th and early 17th centuries, for solo voice or voices accompanied by a group of instruments, most commonly viols. Although usually in five parts, some early examples of four-part songs exist. It is considered to be the chief representative of a native musical tradition which resisted the onslaught of the italianate madrigal and the English lute ayre, and survived those forms' brilliant but short-lived ascendancy (Brett 2001).

In contemporary usage, the term was confined to a number of songs for four voices accompanied by the standard mixed consort of six instruments, found in Teares or Lamentacions of a Sorrowfull Soule: Composed with Musicall Ayres and Songs, both for Voyces and Divers Instruments by William Leighton, published in 1614, but was first used in the modern sense by Thurston Dart (Brett 2001).

William Byrd is recognized as the composer whose adoption and development of the consort song established its musical importance. He regarded it as a standard means to set vernacular poetry (Brett 2001).
