= The Parley of Instruments =

The Parley of Instruments is a London-based early music group founded in 1979. The ensemble's co-founders were Peter Holman and the violinist Roy Goodman, who have been the ensemble's two main conductors. The name "parley of instruments" comes from the London concerts in 1676 organised by the violinist John Banister.

== Discography ==
The Parley of Instruments has an extensive discography spanning 30 years, including many recordings of lesser-known English baroque music in the English Orpheus series of Hyperion Records. The ensemble now records on the Chandos Classics label.
