= Richard Campbell (English musician) =

English classical musician

Background information
- Born: 21 February 1956; Hammersmith, London, England
- Died: 8 March 2011 (aged 55); Truro, Cornwall, England
- Genres: Classical
- Occupation: Performer
- Instrument(s): Cello, Viola da gamba
- Years active: 1980–2011
- Labels: Virgin Classics, Harmonia Mundi
- Formerly of: Fretwork, The Feinstein Ensemble

Richard John Campbell (21 February 1956 – 8 March 2011) was an English classical musician, best known as a founder member of the early music ensemble Fretwork and for his newer association with the Feinstein Ensemble, specialising in historically accurate performance of 18th-century music.

== Early life and education ==
Campbell was born in Hammersmith, London, where his parents were teachers, and was educated at Marlborough College and Peterhouse, Cambridge, where he studied Classics. After rejecting a career as a Latin teacher as having 'dubious prospects', he went to study at the Royal Conservatory of The Hague and the Guildhall.

== Career ==
With Fretwork, he recorded 31 albums, and also performed on film soundtracks including Coffee and Cigarettes and The Da Vinci Code. Fretwork is known for its global touring and, as well as performances of early music, commissioning new compositions for viol consort.

Campbell was Professor of viola da gamba and violone at the Royal Academy of Music. As a gamba soloist he has been associated since 1981 with Sir John Eliot Gardiner's English Baroque Soloists and their performances and recordings of J. S. Bach and François Couperin. He has performed as gamba-soloist or principal cellist with ensembles including Northern Sinfonia, the orchestra of The Sixteen, Ex Cathedra of Birmingham, the City of London Sinfonia, the St James's Baroque Players, Florilegium, and Paul McCreesh's Gabrieli Players. He was a founding member of Jakob Lindberg's Dowland Consort, Philip Picket's Musicians of the Globe and, Charles Humphries's ensemble Kontrabande.
