= John Attey =

English composer (??–c.1640)

John Attey (d. c. 1640) was an English composer of lute songs or ayres.

Little is known about his life. He appears to have been patronised by John Egerton, 1st Earl of Bridgewater and the Countess Frances, to whom he dedicates his First Booke of Ayres of Foure Parts, with Tableture for the Lute, in 1622. On the title-page of this work he calls himself a "Gentleman and Practitioner of Musicke." It contains fourteen songs in four parts, which may be sung as part-songs or as solos by a soprano voice, accompanied by the lute, or the lute and bass-viol. The suggestion that the accompaniment could be lute alone is unusual.

As no second collection appeared, it is probable that the composer did not meet with sufficient encouragement in all cases. Besides, the English madrigal period was rapidly declining; indeed, the book is among the last known books of lute airs. He died at Ross about 1640.

== Works ==
- First Booke of Ayres of Foure Parts, with Tableture for the Lute, pub. 1622; ed. Edmund Fellowes, 1926; Greer, 1967.
  1. On a time the amorous Silvy
  2. The gordion knot which Alexander
  3. What is all this world but vaine?
  4. In a grove of trees of Mirtle
  5. Shall I tell you whom I love?
  6. My dearest and devinest love
  7. Bright Starre of Beauty
  8. Think not tis I alone
  9. Joy my muse, since there is one
  10. My dayes, my moneths, my yeares
  11. Madame, for you I little grieve
  12. Resound my voyce
  13. Vaine hope adue
  14. Sweet was the song the Virgin sung
