= Edin Karamazov =

- Born: Edin Džananović; 1965 (age 60–61); Zenica, SR Bosnia and Herzegovina, Yugoslavia
- Genres: Classical; Folk
- Occupations: Lutenist; Guitarist
- Instruments: Lute; Guitar

Edin Karamazov (born Edin Džananović in 1965) is a Bosnian musician, lutenist and guitarist.

== Biography ==
Karamazov studied lute with Hopkinson Smith at the Schola Cantorum Basiliensis. He has worked with such ensembles as Hesperion XX, L'Arpeggiata, Hilliard Ensemble, Mala Punica, Orpheus Chamber Orchestra and singers Andreas Scholl, María Cristina Kiehr, Arianna Savall, and Sting.

Karamazov accompanied Andreas Scholl on his album Wayfaring Stranger (Decca 2001). Collaborations with Sting in the field of 16th century music resulted in the album and film Songs from the Labyrinth, devoted to the lute-songs of John Dowland (DG, 2007).

Karamazov's first solo project The Lute Is a Song (Decca, 2008) includes guest appearances of Sting, Renée Fleming and Macedonian singer and songwriter Kaliopi.

Karamazov's second solo archlute recording Britten - Bach (Alpha, 2011) features Benjamin Britten's "Nocturne" and Johann Sebastian Bach's violin Partita in D-minor.

He has also recorded with the Croatian women's vocal group hr:Klapa Cesarice (Menart, 2012).

== Discography ==
- Confronting Silence, with Žarko Hajdarhodžić (Hrvatsko Drustvo Skladatelja, 2004)
- Come, Heavy Sleep (Alpha, 2004)
- Concerto in Dialogo (Aquarius, 2004)
- Songs from the Labyrinth, with Sting (Deutsche Grammophon, 2007)
- The Journey and the Labyrinth with Sting (Deutsche Grammophon, 2007)
- The Lute Is a Song (L'Oiseau-Lyre, 2009)
- Oblivion with Kaliopi (Kaliopi, 2009)
- Klapa Cesarice & Edin Karamazov (Menart, 2012)
- Reminiscences: Music Inspired by the Beatles and Sting (Lumaudis, 2018)
- Lachrimae with Božo Vrećo (Croatia, 2020)
