= Shirley Rumsey =

English musician

Shirley Rumsey

Shirley Rumsey is an English musician who recorded two solo CDs of Renaissance music for Naxos Records in the mid 1990s. She studied lute and voice at the Royal College of Music in London. There she became interested in solo vocal music accompanied by the lute, and she developed a career performing that repertoire. Rumsey also plays the vihuela and the Renaissance guitar. In addition to solo recitals and recordings, she collaborates with lutenist Christopher Wilson, with whom she co-directs the ensemble Kithara.

== Discography ==
- Music of the Spanish Renaissance, 1993, Naxos Records. Shirley Rumsey: Lute, Renaissance Guitar, Vihuela, Vocals
- Music of the Italian Renaissance, 1994, Naxos Records. Shirley Rumsey: Lute, Renaissance Guitar, Vihuela, Vocals
