= Diomedes Cato =

Italian composer

Diomedes Cato (1560 to 1565 – d.1627 in Gdansk) was an Italian-born composer and lute player, who lived and worked entirely in Poland and Lithuania. He is known mainly for his instrumental music. He mixed the style of the late Renaissance with the emerging Baroque, and also Italian idioms with Polish folk material; and in addition he was one of the first native-born Italian composers to visit Sweden.

== Life ==
He was born near Treviso between 1560 and 1565, possibly at Serravale where his father is documented as being a teacher. Around 1565 his family, who were Protestants, fled Italy to escape the Inquisition, and settled in Poland. Cato, who had left Italy before the age of five, received all of his musical education in Kraków, where the family settled. The first record of his employment dates from 1588, when he was hired as a lutenist by the court of King Sigismund III Vasa, a position he kept until 1593. In 1591, he wrote music for the wedding of Jan Kostka at Świecie castle; the Kostka family may have been patrons of his, since Stanisław Kostka left him a considerable legacy in 1602.

In 1593 and 1594, he went with King Sigismund to Sweden, where his fame as a lutenist and composer was evidently large; as late as 1600, he was still the most famous composer of Italian origin known in Sweden. Some of his music, including a few Polish dances, survives from sources only in Sweden. The last tentative record of his life is from 1619, when there is a single unconfirmed reference to him playing the lute during that year.

== Music ==
Cato wrote both vocal and instrumental music, and both sacred and secular: however he was most famous for his works for lute. The lute works include dozens of pieces in many forms and styles, including choreae polonicae, fantasias, galliards, transcriptions of Italian madrigals, passamezzos, and preludes, all of which he probably played himself. Stylistically, they cover the full range of possibilities on the lute. The preludes are chordal for the most part; the fantasias are imitative ricercars; and there is a set of eight Polish dances, probably derived from actual folk music. Some aspects of early Baroque style are clear in Cato's music, including the use of short motifs which recur to unify longer sections, and the use of linking episodic sections between thematic statements; on the other hand, some of his lute music includes lines of vocal character in strict imitation, more in the style of the mid-to-late 16th century polyphonists.

Other instrumental music by Cato includes pieces for consorts of viols, as well as solo keyboard.

His vocal works include settings of Polish sacred songs in a collection entitled Rytmy łacińskie dziwnie sztuczne ... for four voices and lute, as well as Pieśń o świętym Stanisławie, for four voices unaccompanied. He also wrote an Italian madrigal, Tirsi morir volea, for five voices, though it only exists in an arrangement for solo voice and instrumental accompaniment: a transcription which could represent a conscious conformance to the new Baroque conception of the solo madrigal.
