= Tobias Hume =

Scottish composer, viol player and soldier

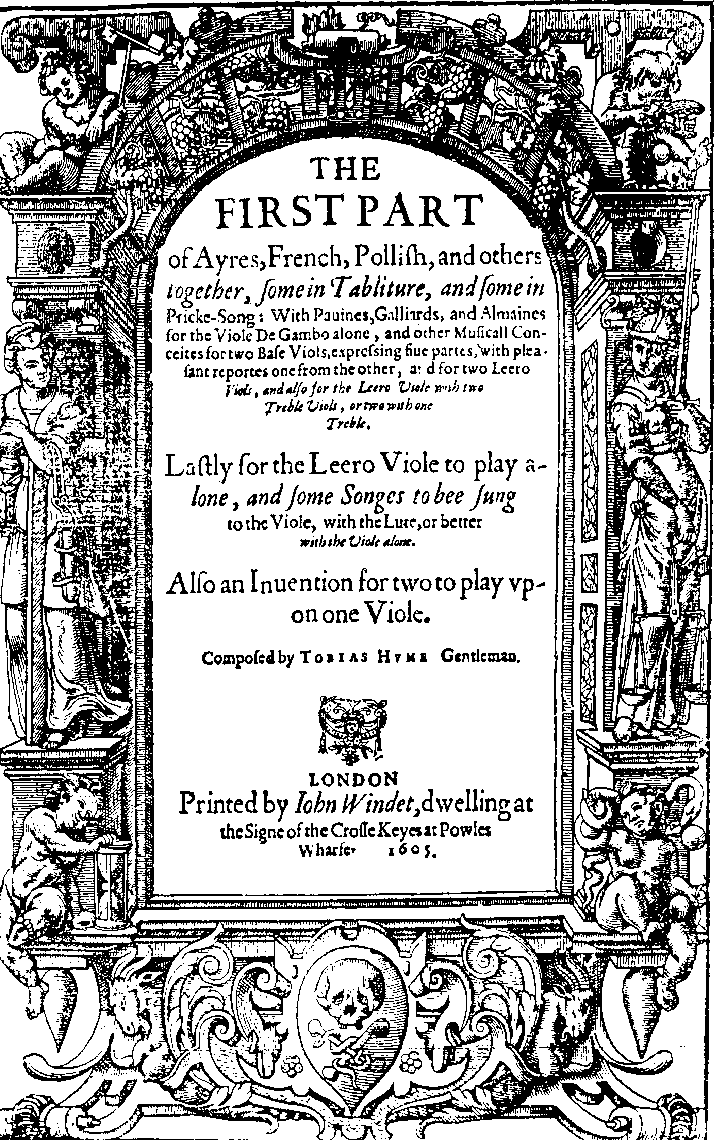
Title page of Hume's First Part of Ayres (1605), printed by John Windet

Tobias Hume (possibly 1579 – 16 April 1645) was a Scottish composer, viol player and soldier.

Tobacco, No.3, the First Part of Ayres - The Musicall Humours (1605)

Captaine Hume’s Pavan, No.46, the First Part of Ayres - The Musicall Humours (1605)

Love’s Farewell, No.47, the First Part of Ayres - The Musicall Humours (1605)

The Spirit of Gambo (The Lord Dewys Favoret) from Captaine Hume’s Poeticall Musicke (1607)
Performed by Phillip W. Serna, Viols & Violone

Musicke & Mirth (Lady Hattons Delight) from Captaine Humes Poeticall Musicke (1607)
Performed by Phillip W. Serna & Christopher Burrus

Little is known of his life. Some have suggested that he was born in 1579 because he was admitted to the London Charterhouse in 1629, a prerequisite to which was being at least 50 years old, though there is no certainty over this. He had made his living as a professional soldier, serving as an officer with the Swedish and Russian armies.

His published music includes pieces for viols (including many solo works for the lyra viol) and songs. They were gathered in two collections, The First Part of Ayres (or Musicall Humors, 1605) and Captain Humes Poeticall Musicke (1607). He was a particular champion of the viol over the then-dominant lute, something which caused John Dowland to publish a rebuttal of Hume's ideas.

Hume was also known as a prankster, as some of his somewhat unusual compositions illustrate. His most notorious piece was "An Invention for Two to Play upone one Viole", also known as Prince's Almayne. Two bows are required and the smaller of the two players is obliged to sit in the lap of the larger player. This work was notated in tablature and is indeed technically possible to play. His instructions to "drum this with the backe of your bow" in another piece, "Harke, harke," from the First Part of Ayres, constitute the earliest known use of col legno in Western music.

At Christmas 1629 he entered Charterhouse as a poor brother. His mind seems to have given way, for in July 1642 he published a rambling True Petition of Colonel Hume to parliament offering either to defeat the rebels in Ireland with a hundred 'instruments of war,' or, if furnished with a complete navy, to bring the king within three months twenty millions of money. He styles himself 'colonel,' but the rank was probably of his own invention, for in the entry of his death, which took place at Charterhouse on Wednesday, 16 April 1645, he is still called Captain Hume.

== In popular culture ==
Tobias Hume is the main character of the novel Loot and Loyalty written by Jerzy Pietrkiewicz.
