= The First Book of Songs =

Collection of songs by John Dowland

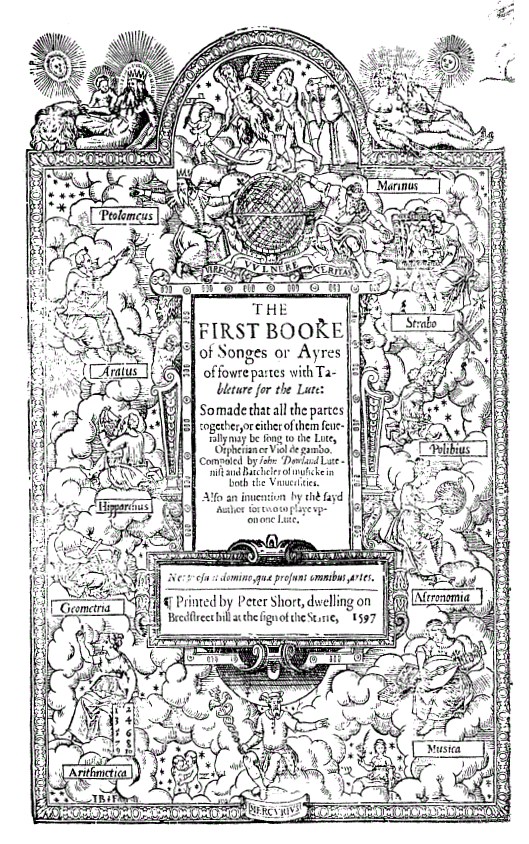
Front page of First Booke of Songes or Ayres of Fowre Partes with Tableture for the Lute, 1597

The First Book of Songs (title in Early Modern English: First Booke of Songes or Ayres) is a collection of 21 songs by John Dowland, which also includes one instrumental piece. The book was first published in London in 1597 and was reprinted several times, "Newly corrected and amended", during the composer's lifetime.

The first edition was printed by Peter Short. It contains a dedication to the Lord Chamberlain, Sir George Carey, Baron Hunsdon, and his wife Elizabeth, Lady Hunsdon (née Elizabeth Spencer).

== Music ==
The vocal writing is often described as lute songs, implying that it is written for solo voice and accompaniment. The music is set out this way in the Stainer & Bell edition, for example. However, the editions printed in the composer's lifetime give a different picture of the composer's intentions, because he offered more than one way of performing his music. All the songs in the First Book of Songs can be performed in a four-part version (as the title page suggests) and they thus come into the category of madrigals.

The music is laid out in such a way that the musicians can gather round a table

In his remarks ‘To the courteous Reader’, Dowland acknowledges the influence of the Italian composer Marenzio, who had become well known in England as the result of the collection Musica Transalpina, containing madrigals of four, five and six parts, which appeared in 1588. He also mentions 'familiar conference' with Giovanni Croce of St. Mark's in Venice.

The instrumental piece is the duet for lute "My Lord Chamberlain, His Galliard (an invention for two to play upon one lute)".

== Words ==
Most of the lyrics are anonymous, but the authors of a few of the songs have been identified, for example, Fulke Greville to whom the first number Vnquiet thoughts has been attributed.

Audiences hearing Dowland's songs in contemporary pronunciation often miss hearing rhymes that worked well originally (for example, die/sympathy in Come Again). In recent years, there has been interest in reviving the original pronunciation of the texts. An important scholar in this field is the linguist David Crystal, who as well as being involved in OP performance at Shakespeare's Globe has worked on song lyrics.

== Sequels and new editions ==
In his address to the "courteous reader" at the beginning of the book, Dowland announced his intention to publish more songs. In 1600 the Second Book of Songs was published (using a different team: George Eastland, publisher and Thomas East, printer). A Third Book of Songs was published in 1603.

The First Book was the most successful, and continued to be published, although Peter Short, the original printer, died in 1603. The third edition of 1603 was printed by his widow Emma. The book was reprinted by Humphrey Lownes in 1606 and again in 1613, with minor corrections.

== Recordings ==
Come away, sung by Collegium Vocale Bydgoszcz

Many solo singers have recorded individual songs from the First Book of Songs, for example the countertenor Alfred Deller (from the 1950s) and Sting in his album Songs from the Labyrinth (2006). Those who have recorded all the songs include the tenor Rufus Müller with Christopher Wilson (Decca, 1993) and the soprano Grace Davidson with David Miller (Hyperion, recorded 2016). Rather than just have a solo singer, the Consort of Musick adopts a range of approaches. Their 1970s recording of the First Book for L' Oiseau-Lyre, part of a set Dowland - The Collected Works, featuring Emma Kirkby (soprano), John York Skinner (counter-tenor), Martyn Hill (tenor), and David Thomas (bass), has been reissued on CD.
