= Roy Goodman =

English conductor and violinist

Roy Goodman (born 26 January 1951) is an English conductor and violinist, specialising in the performance and direction of early music. He became internationally famous as the 12-year-old boy treble soloist in the March 1963 recording of Allegri's Miserere with the Choir of King's College, Cambridge, under David Willcocks.

== Life and career ==
Goodman was born in Guildford, studied at the Royal College of Music, and became a Fellow of the Royal College of Organists and Associate of the Royal College of Music. He has also served as Director of Music at the University of Kent in Canterbury and Director of Early music Studies at the Royal Academy of Music.

As a violinist and concertmaster, he played from 1975 to 1985 under the baton of Iván Fischer, John Eliot Gardiner, Charles Mackerras, Roger Norrington, and Simon Rattle (at Glyndebourne Opera). He was viola d'amore soloist with the Academy of St Martin in the Fields under Neville Marriner and the Philharmonia Orchestra under Vladimir Ashkenazy. He has also played as soloist on baroque violin with Frans Brüggen, Philippe Herreweghe, Christopher Hogwood, René Jacobs, Trevor Pinnock and Ton Koopman.

In July 1999 Goodman conducted the premiere of Jonas Forssell's Trädgården (The Garden) at the Drottningholm theatre in Stockholm, the first new opera to be premiered there in modern times.

As a conductor, Roy Goodman is known for his special expertise with early music, which he often directed from the violin, harpsichord or organ. He was conductor of Reading Youth Orchestra (1974–1976), founder and director of the Brandenburg Consort (1975–2001), co-director of the Parley of Instruments (1979–1986), Principal Conductor of the Hanover Band (1986–1994) and Music Director of the European Union Baroque Orchestra (1989–2004). He is Principal Guest Conductor of the English Chamber Orchestra and Director Emeritus of the European Union Baroque Orchestra. He has served as Guest Conductor with over 100 other orchestras, ensembles, and opera companies. In 2006 he made his debut with the Royal Concertgebouw Orchestra in Amsterdam and returned to San Francisco Opera to conduct a new production of Mozart’s The Marriage of Figaro.

As a conductor Goodman has made over 120 recordings ranging from Monteverdi to Copland. Goodman has also directed more than forty world premières of contemporary music.

In 2003, Goodman pleaded guilty to operating his 24 foot trailer-sailer yacht Royana while under the influence of alcohol. Goodman ran this small yacht aground on Calshot Spit, near Southampton.

Roy Goodman made his New Zealand debut in 2007, performing a series of Baroque concerts. Following the enthusiastic response of audiences and critics, he accepted the position of Principal Guest Conductor for the Auckland Philharmonia Orchestra, which he held until 2011. In 2010, he made his debut at the Sydney Opera House with three concerts, and in 2011 he was affectionately named the "Rafa Nadal of conductors" by Radio New Zealand. He has three children and five grandchildren.
