= Anthony Holborne =

British composer

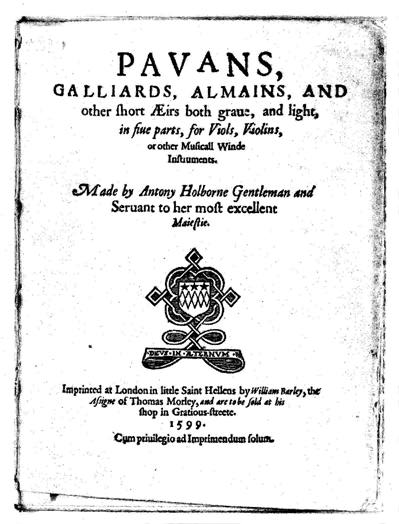
Title page of Anthony Holborne's Pavans, Galliards, Almains, and other short Æirs … (1599), published by William Barley

Anthony [Antony] Holborne [Holburne] (c. 1545 – 29 November 1602) was a composer of music for lute, cittern, and instrumental consort during the reign of Queen Elizabeth I.

== Life ==
An "Anthony Holburne" entered Pembroke College, Cambridge in 1562, and it is possible that this person is the same as the composer. A Londoner of the same name was admitted to the Inner Temple Court in 1565, and again this may have been the same person. It is certain, however, that the composer was the brother of William Holborne and that he married Elisabeth Marten on 14 June 1584. On the title page of both his books, he claims to be in the service of Queen Elizabeth. He died of a "cold" in November 1602.

He was held in the highest regard as a composer by his contemporaries. John Dowland dedicated the first song I saw my lady weepe in his Second Booke to Holborne. His patron was the Countess of Pembroke, Mary Sidney. In the 1590s, he entered the service of Robert Cecil, 1st Earl of Salisbury.

His brother was William Holborne. Six of William's madrigals were included in the Cittarn Schoole.

== Music ==
His first known book was the Cittarn Schoole of 1597, consisting of compositions for the cittern. The preface indicates the pieces were composed over a number of years. He writes that the musical compositions are "untimely fruits of my youth, begotten in the cradle and infancy of my slender skill."

The Pavans, Galliards, Almains and other short Aeirs, both grave and light, in five parts, for Viols, Violins, or other Musicall Winde Instruments was published in 1599 and consisted of 65 of his own compositions. It is the largest surviving collection of its kind. Most are of the pavan-galliard combination. Other pieces are in the allemande style. The rest are unclassified.

The Early Music Consort of London's 1976 recording of "The Fairie Round" from this collection was included on the Voyager Golden Record, copies of which were sent into space aboard the Voyager 1 and Voyager 2 space probes in 1977, as a representation of human culture and achievement to any spacefaring civilisations who might find it.
