= Flow, my tears =

Song composed by John Dowland

"Flow, my tears" (originally "Early Modern English: Flow my teares fall from your springs") is a lute song (specifically, an "ayre") by the accomplished lutenist and composer John Dowland (1563–1626). Originally written as an instrumental under the name "Lachrimae pavane", prior to 1596, it is Dowland's most famous ayre, and became his signature song, literally as well as metaphorically: he would occasionally sign his name "Jo: dolandi de Lachrimae".

== Details ==
Like others of Dowland's lute songs, the piece's musical form and style are based on a dance, in this case the pavan. It was first published by Dowland in The Second Booke of Songs or Ayres of 2, 4 and 5 parts (London, 1600). A version of the tune had previously been published in 1596 by William Barley, described by Dowland as "false and unperfect". The song begins with a falling tear motif, starting on an A and descending to an E by step on the text "Flow, my tears":

This may have been borrowed from an Orlando di Lasso motet or Luca Marenzio madrigal (this type of motif was common in Elizabethan music to signify grief), in addition to other borrowings in the piece. Anthony Boden calls the song "probably the most widely known English song of the early 17th century."

== Variants ==
There have been many instrumental versions of this song, most entitled "Lachrimae" (or "Lachrymae", literally "tears"). In this case the instrumental version was written first, as "Lachrimae pavane", and lyrics were later added. It is believed that the text was written specifically for the music, and may have been written by Dowland himself. The English musicologist Peter Holman claims that the first pavan of "Lachrimae" (called "Lachrimae Antiquae", or the "Old Tears") is "perhaps the single most popular and widely distributed instrumental piece of the period". According to Holman, it exists in around 100 manuscripts and printings across Europe including England, Scotland, The Netherlands, France, Germany, Austria, Denmark, Sweden, and Italy, in different arrangements for ensemble and solo.

There is no "definitive" version of the piece. Dowland and his contemporaries supposedly played their own versions in a semi-improvised fashion, like jazz musicians today. Holman argues that the popularity of "Lachrimae" came from its rich melodic and motivic nature. Other English composers in the period generally gave only one or two ideas per strain and padded them out with dull, diffusive contrapuntal writing. In contrast, Dowland's "Lachrimae" provide a variety of strikingly melodic ideas and furthermore they are tightly and tactfully interconnected.

Instrumental versions by Dowland include "Lachrimae" for lute, "Galliard to Lachrimae" for lute and "Lachrimae antiquae" (1604) for consort. Dowland also published Lachrimae, or Seaven Teares (London, 1604), a collection of consort music which included a cycle of seven "Lachrimae" pavans based on the falling tear motif. Thomas Morley set the "Lachrimae Pauin" for the six instruments of a broken consort in his First Booke of Consort Lessons (London, 1599).

Other composers have written pieces based on the work, including Jan Pieterszoon Sweelinck, Thomas Tomkins, and Tobias Hume's What Greater Griefe, while John Danyel's Eyes, look no more pays clear homage to the piece, as does John Bennet's "Weep, o mine eyes". In the 20th century, American composer and conductor Victoria Bond wrote Old New Borrowed Blues (Variations on Flow my Tears). Benjamin Britten quotes the incipit of "Flow, my tears" in his Lachrymae for viola, a set of variations on Dowland's ayre "If my complaints could passions move". In 2006, the British electronic music group Banco de Gaia produced a vocoded version called "Flow my Dreams, the Android Wept".

== Lyrics ==
Flow, my tears
Soprano and lute

Flow my teares fall from your springs,
Exilde for euer: Let mee morne
Where nights black bird hir sad infamy sings,
There let mee liue forlorne.

Downe vaine lights shine you no more,
No nights are dark enough for those
That in dispaire their last fortuns deplore,
Light doth but shame disclose.

Neuer may my woes be relieued,
Since pittie is fled,
And teares, and sighes, and grones my wearie dayes, my wearie dayes,
Of all ioyes haue depriued.

Frōm the highest spire of contentment,
My fortune is throwne,
And feare, and griefe, and paine for my deserts, for my deserts,
Are my hopes since hope is gone.

Harke you shadowes that in darcknesse dwell,
Learne to contemne light,
Happie, happie they that in hell
Feele not the worlds despite.

— "Flow my teares fall from your springs"
from The Second Booke of Songs or Ayres,
of 2.4.and 5.parts: With Tableture for the Lute or Orpherian,
with the Violl de Gamba (1600)
Translation:

Flow, my tears, fall from your springs!
Exiled for ever, let me mourn;
Where night's black bird her sad infamy sings,
There let me live forlorn.

Down vain lights, shine you no more!
No nights are dark enough for those
That in despair their last fortunes deplore.
Light doth but shame disclose.

Never may my woes be relieved,
Since pity is fled;
And tears and sighs and groans my weary days, my weary days
Of all joys have deprived.

From the highest spire of contentment
My fortune is thrown;
And fear and grief and pain for my deserts, for my deserts
Are my hopes, since hope is gone.

Hark! you shadows that in darkness dwell,
Learn to contemn light
Happy, happy they that in hell
Feel not the world's despite.

— Modern transcription

== In other media ==
Lines 8–10 are quoted in the 1974 Philip K. Dick novel Flow My Tears, the Policeman Said, the title of which is also an allusion to the song.

== Footnotes ==
=== Sources ===
- Boden, Anthony (2005). Thomas Tomkins: The Last Elizabethan. Aldershot, England: Ashgate Publishing. ISBN 0-7546-5118-5.
- Bonaventura, Sam di; Jepson, Barbara; Block, Adrienne Fried (n.d.). "Victoria Bond". In L. Macy (ed.). Grove Music Online. (subscription required)
- Brown, David (2001). "John Bennet (i)". Grove Music Online (8th ed.). Oxford University Press. doi:10.1093/gmo/9781561592630.article.02701. ISBN 978-1-56159-263-0. (subscription, Wikilibrary access, or UK public library membership required) (subscription required)
- Dowland, John (1600). Second Booke of Songs or Ayres. Facsimile edition of the original manuscript M2DOW.
- Fortune, Nigel; Greer, David; Dill, Charles (2001). "Air (i)". Grove Music Online (8th ed.). Oxford University Press. doi:10.1093/gmo/9781561592630.article.48638. ISBN 978-1-56159-263-0. (subscription, Wikilibrary access, or UK public library membership required) (subscription required)
- Holman, Peter (1999). Dowland: Lachrimae (1604). Cambridge University Press. doi:10.1017/CBO9780511605666. ISBN 0-521-58829-4.
- Roberts, Timothy (May 2006). "For the home keyboardist". Early Music (review of Hogwood, Dowland: Keyboard music). 34 (2): 311–313. doi:10.1093/em/cal015.
- Scott, David; Greer, David (2001). "John Danyel". Grove Music Online (8th ed.). Oxford University Press. doi:10.1093/gmo/9781561592630.article.07199. ISBN 978-1-56159-263-0. (subscription, Wikilibrary access, or UK public library membership required) (subscription required)
- Caldwell, John, ed. (1991). The Oxford History of English Music: Volume 1: From the Beginnings to c.1715. Oxford: Oxford University Press. ISBN 0-19-816129-8.
