= Lachrimae, or Seaven Teares =

1604 collection of instrumental music by John Dowland

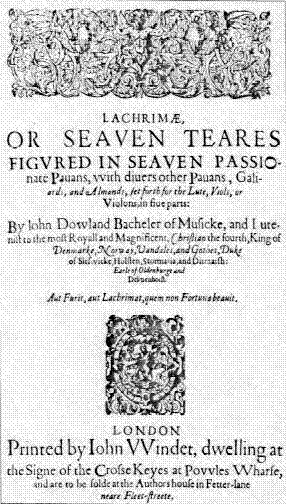
Front page of Lachrimae or Seaven Teares Figured in Seaven Passionate Pavans.

Lachrimæ or seaven teares figured in seaven passionate pavans, with divers other pavans, galliards and allemands, set forth for the lute, viols, or violons, in five parts is a collection of instrumental music composed by John Dowland. It was published by John Windet in 1604. It consists of a set of seven slow pieces which the composer calls tears ("teares" in Early Modern spelling) plus other pieces including some livelier numbers.

The title page of Lachrimæ is adorned with a Latin epigram: "Aut Furit, aut Lachrimat, quem non Fortuna beavit" ("He whom Fortune has not blessed either rages or weeps"). Dowland points out in his dedication that there are different types of tears. “The teares which Musicke weeps” can be pleasant; “neither are teares shed always in sorrow but sometime in joy and gladnesse”.

== Instrumentation ==
As the title page suggests, the music is scored for five viols, or alternatively violins (that is, members of the violin family), and lute.

== Lachrimae pavans ==
The seven pavans are variations on a theme, the "Lachrimæ pavan", which Dowland had already made well known as a lute solo and a song. The pavan was reworked into the song "Flow my tears" in Dowland's Second Book of Songs (1600) and begins with a "falling tear" motif of four notes:

The harmonies of the seven are intense, with lines weaving close together. Each was given a title by the composer, and there has been speculation that the group forms a narrative or musical journey, though any meaning remains unclear:

- Lachrimæ antiquae (Old Tears) — already existed as a lute solo and a song
- Lachrimæ antiquae novæ (Old Tears Renewed) — a harmonic parody of Lachrimæ antiquæ
- Lachrimæ gementes (Sighing Tears)
- Lachrimæ tristes (Sad Tears)
- Lachrimæ coactae (Forced Tears) — a harmonic parody of Lachrimæ tristes
- Lachrimæ amantis (A Lover’s Tears)
- Lachrimæ veræ (True Tears)

== Other compositions ==
John Dowland (1563-1626) - The King of Denmark Galliard à5, Lachrimae, No.11

John Dowland (1563-1626) - Mistress Nichols Almand à5, Lachrimae, No.20

John Dowland (1563-1626) - M. George Whitehead His Almand, Lachrimae, No.21
Performed by Phillip W. Serna

The “divers other” compositions are: two allemandes (“almands”), nine lively galliards (“galiards”), two sombre pavans, and a “funerall.” They are dedicated to people of varying social rank, including a pirate, Digorie Piper, who is not fully named. “M” is mister, “Mss” is mistress. Still the scoring is for lute and 5 viols (or violins):

- Pavan “Semper Dowland semper Dolens” P9
- “Sir Henry Umptons Funerall” [sic]
- “M John Langtons Pavan” [sic] P14
- “The King of Denmarks Galiard” [sic] P40
- “The Earle of Essex Galiard” [sic] P42, dedicated to Robert Devereux, 2nd Earl of Essex
- “Sir John Souch his Galiard” [sic] P26
- “M Henry Noell his Galiard” [sic] P34
- “M Giles Hoby his Galiard” [sic] P29
- “M Nicholas Gryffith his Galiard” [sic]
- “M Thomas Collier his Galiard with 2 Trebles” [sic]
- “Captaine Piper his Galiard” [sic] P88
- “M Bucton his Galiard” [sic]
- “Mss Nichols Almand” [sic] P52
- “M George Whitehead his Almand” [sic]

== Publication ==
From 1598 Dowland was employed as lutenist to Christian IV of Denmark, but he still published in London, where he seems to have maintained a family home. The title-page of Lachrimae states that the book can be purchased from the "author's house" in Fetter Lane. In the case of the Second Book of Songs (1600), we know that Mrs Dowland was in London and handed over the manuscript. In the case of Lachrimae, he may have been back in England long enough to oversee the publication process directly. The book was dedicated to Anne of Denmark, and Dowland mentions meeting her at Winchester, which suggests his involvement in her October 1603 masque, Prince Henry's Welcome at Winchester.

== Recordings ==
Recordings include Lachrimae, or Seven Tears by the viol consort Phantasm with Elizabeth Kenny (lute) directed by Laurence Dreyfus.
