= Come Again (Dowland) =

Song by John Dowland

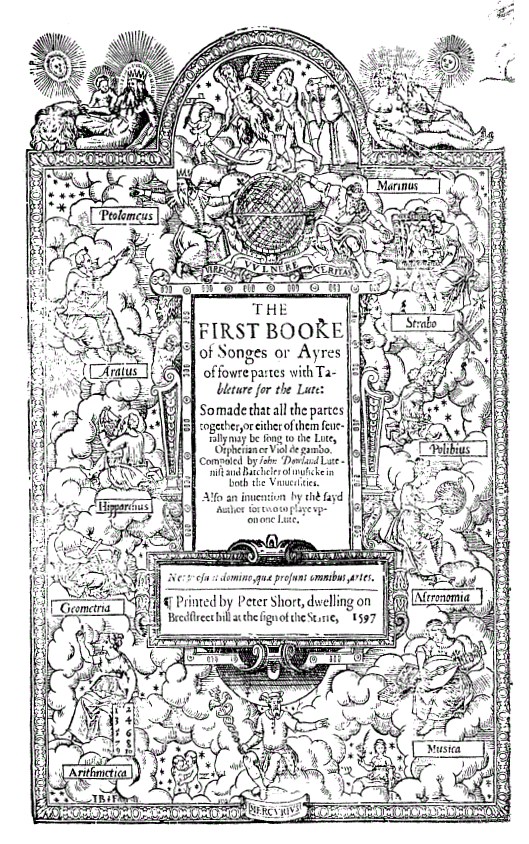
Front page of First Booke of Songes or Ayres of Fowre Partes with Tableture for the Lute, 1597

"Come Again, sweet love doth now invite" is a song by John Dowland. The lyrics are anonymous. The song is bitter-sweet, typical of Dowland who cultivated a melancholy style.

It was included in Dowland's First Booke of Songes or Ayres, which appeared in 1597. The piece is often performed as a lute song by soloist and lute, but, like other songs in the First Booke, it is printed in a format that can also be performed as a madrigal by a small vocal group (typically SATB).

The first two verses are addressed to the lover. The later verses speak to the reader about the lover, and the singer's thoughts. In the first verse, the words "to touch, to kiss, to die, with thee again in sweetest sympathy" use the Elizabeth euphemism of "dying" for experiencing orgasm, literally, "come again! sweet love". But the poet's later thoughts shift to ideas of actual death, dying "in deadly pain". His love is unrequited, so he asks "Love", that is "Eros" or "Cupid" to withdraw his "wounding dart" that inspires a person to love.

== Lyrics ==
Come again!
Sweet love doth now invite
Thy graces that refrain
To do me due delight,
To see, to hear, to touch, to kiss, to die,
With thee again in sweetest sympathy.

Come again!
That I may cease to mourn
Through thy unkind disdain;
For now left and forlorn
I sit, I sigh, I weep, I faint, I die
In deadly pain and endless misery.

All the day
The sun that lends me shine
By frowns do cause me pine
And feeds me with delay;
Her smiles, my springs that makes my joys to grow,
Her frowns the Winters of my woe.

All the night
My sleeps are full of dreams,
My eyes are full of streams.
My heart takes no delight
To see the fruits and joys that some do find
And mark the storms are me assign'd.

Out alas,
My faith is ever true,
Yet will she never rue
Nor yield me any grace;
Her eyes of fire, her heart of flint is made,
Whom tears nor truth may once invade.

Gentle Love,
Draw forth thy wounding dart,
Thou canst not pierce her heart;
For I, that do approve
By sighs and tears more hot than are thy shafts
Did tempt while she for triumph laughs.
