= In darkness let me dwell =

1610 song ascribed to John Dowland

"In darkness let me dwell" is a song ascribed to the lutenist and composer John Dowland. Published in 1610, late in Dowland's career, the song shows the influence of Italian music of the early baroque. It was published as song no. 10 in A Musical Banquet, a 1610 anthology of songs for lute and voice from England, France, Italy, and Spain compiled by Robert Dowland, John's son. Dowland scholar Dawn Grapes describes the song as "perhaps the most disconsolate and evocative of all Dowland's lute songs". "In darkness let me dwell" has been recorded by many artists, including Steven Rickards and Dorothy Linell, and by Alexander Chance and Toby Carr.

The text for Dowland's setting utilizes the first stanza of an anonymous poem included in the 1606 song collection Funeral Teares by John Coprario. Dowland's setting eventually became more famous than the Coprario setting.

== Text ==
In darkness let me dwell; the ground shall sorrow be,
The roof despair, to bar all cheerful light from me;
The walls of marble black, that moist'ned still shall weep;
My music, hellish jarring sounds, to banish friendly sleep.
Thus, wedded to my woes, and bedded in my tomb,
O let me living die, till death doth come, till death doth come.

Second stanza included in the Coprario 1606 setting:

My dainties grief shall be, and tears my poisoned wine,
My sighs the air through which my panting heart shall pine,
My robes my mind shall suit exceeding blackest night,
My study shall be tragic thoughts sad fancy to delight,
Pale ghosts and frightful shades shall my acquaintance be:
O thus, my hapless joy, I haste to thee.
