= Lute song =

Renaissance-Baroque Anglo-French music style

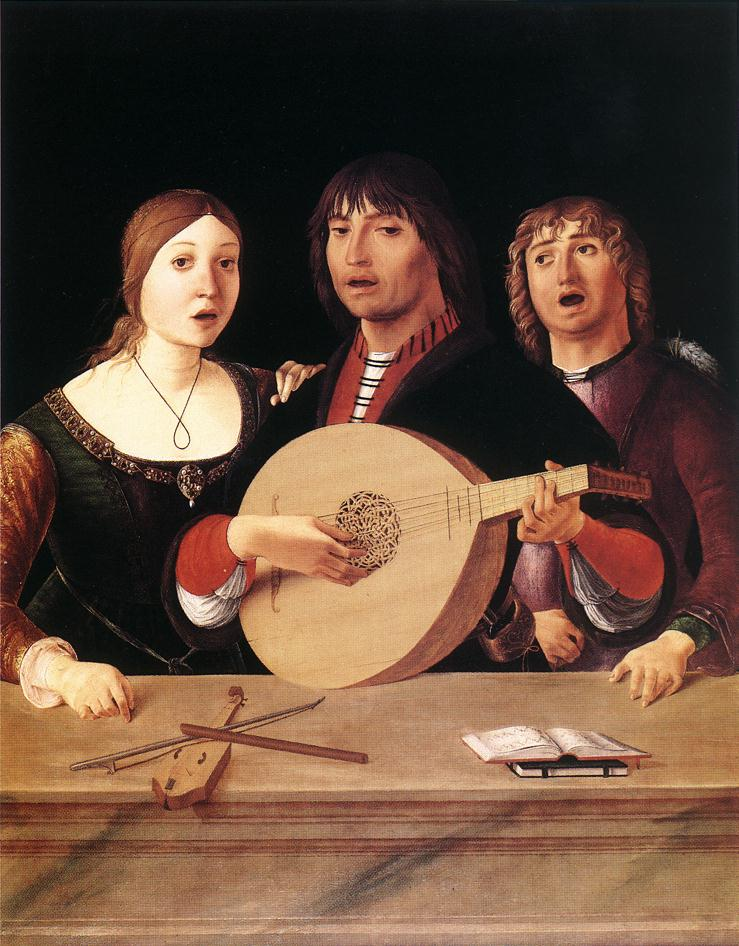
A concert, painting by Lorenzo Costa, in the National Gallery, London

The term lute song is given to a music style from the late 16th century to early 17th century, late Renaissance to early Baroque, that was predominantly in England and France. Lute songs were generally in strophic form or verse repeating with a homophonic texture. The composition was written for a solo voice with an accompaniment, usually the lute. It was not uncommon for other forms of accompaniments such as bass viol or other string instruments, and could also be written for more voices. The composition could be performed either solo or with a small group of instruments.

The basic style of lute songs is light and serious, with poetic lyrics that usually followed word-setting to composed music. In England, the songs tended to range from extended contrapuntal compositions to short harmonized tunes. The text could be written by the composer or most often borrowed from a poem, set in verse form. These songs were composed for professional and amateur performers, which had variations for solo and ensemble. The lute song was popular among the Royalty and nobility. King Louis XIII was believed to be fond of the simple songs, which led to a volume of work during his reign.

Composers of the lute song usually composed other forms of music as well such as madrigals, chansons, and consort songs. The consort song, popular in England, is considered to be closely related to the lute song. This was an earlier strophic form of music that was for a solo voice accompanied by a small group of string instruments. In France, the chanson is a precursor to the lute song or air de cour. Collections of airs de cour were used in other countries, besides England and France. Collections of the French airs were published in England, Germany and Holland. Italy had forms of song such as the frottola that were much like the lute song, but the lute song seemed more prominent in England and France.

== The English lute ayre ==
In England, the lute song was usually called an "ayre", possibly borrowed from the French word, air. The first written record of the lute songs or ayres is a 1597 publication First Booke of Songes or Ayres, which was composed by John Dowland. This is considered the beginning of the popularity of the lute songs, that set the standard for other composer’s songbooks of English ayres. The music was printed on the page, so that when placed in the center of a table it could be read by the performers around the table. John Dowland's ayres, like other composers, used music from dance forms such as pavane, galliard and jig, for the melody.

"I care not for these ladies"
Lute song by Thomas Campion

Philip Rosseter, court musician, composer, and theatrical manager, published a collection in 1601, A Book of Ayres, with composer and poet Thomas Campion. The compositions were short, homophonic songs with minimal phrase repetition with their own lyrics. The last book published was by John Attey in 1622, called First Book of Ayres. The format of these songbooks was intended to be performed with a solo voice and an accompaniment, but some did include variations for multiple voices and additional instruments. It is possible that lute songs were composed before these books were published, but the written record of such songs starts with John Dowland.

The consort song, popular in England during the reign of Henry VIII, leads to some consideration that the lute songs were composed prior to 1597. Other composers of lute songs during this time include John Danyel, Robert Jones, Pilkington and Alfonso Ferrabosco.

== The French air de cour ==
In France, the lute song was called "air de cour". The first airs were not homophonic or solos, but rather polyphonic and for up to four voices. In 1571, Adrian LeRoy published the first collection of airs de cour, a collection of 22 airs with lute accompaniment. In 1582, Composer Didier LeBlanc released a collection of 43 short airs that were strophic form, homophonic and ametric structure. Composer Jean Planson, published 38 short airs in 1587, much like Leblanc; however, his had an ABB form. In the 17th century the popularity of the airs grew. The simple solo strophic melodies were a favorite at the court of Louis XIII (1610–1643). During this time many volumes were released from the Royal court and others. The general form was strophic, with a vocal range of one octave and a tonal harmony, with text usually from pastorals. Other composers of airs were Antoine Boesset, Jean Boyer, Jean-Baptiste Boessert, and Francois Richard.

== See also ==
- English art song
