= John Dowland =

English composer and lutenist (1563–1626)

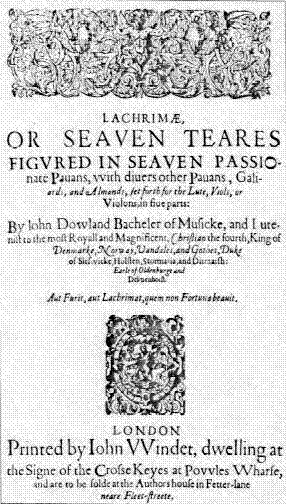
Title page of 1604 Lachrimae

John Dowland (Note: While orthographic evidence from Dowland's time strongly suggests a pronunciation of /ˈdoʊlənd/ for the last name, there is no consensus on the correct pronunciation. By analogy with the name Cowper and the Restoration poet Abraham Cowley, the pronunciation /ˈduːlənd/ is suggested.) (c. 1563 – buried 20 February 1626) was an English Renaissance composer, lutenist, and singer. He is best known today for his melancholy songs such as "Come, heavy sleep", "Come again", "Flow my tears", "I saw my Lady weepe", "Now o now I needs must part", and "In darkness let me dwell". His instrumental music has undergone a major revival, and with the 20th century's early music revival, has been a continuing source of repertoire for lutenists and classical guitarists.

== Life and career ==
Very little is known of Dowland's early life, but it is generally thought he was born in London. Sources put his birth year as 1563, based on his own written statements about his age. Irish historian W. H. Grattan Flood claimed that he was born in Dalkey, near Dublin, (Note: For a full discussion of this claim see Poulton 1982, pp. 21ff.) but no corroborating evidence has been found either for that or for Thomas Fuller's claim that he was born in Westminster. One piece of evidence points to Dublin as his place of origin: he dedicated the song "From Silent Night" to 'my loving countryman Mr. John Forster the younger, merchant of Dublin in Ireland'. The Forsters were a prominent Dublin family at the time, providing several Lord Mayors to the city. (Note: See A. L. Rowse, Discoveries and Reviews from Renaissance to Restoration (London, Macmillan, 1975), p. 194: "'Countryman', in Elizabethan usage, refers to one's own county or locality. When Dowland refers to himself as 'born under her Highness', I think that phrase is more likely to imply birth in Ireland than in England." Dublin and the area around it were effectively governed from London, in contrast with the rest of Ireland, which was nominally governed by England in a rule that was contested where applied. But English-speaking inhabitants of Dublin, pace Diana Poulton, p. 25, did commonly call themselves English, right up to the time of the Duke of Wellington.)

In 1580 Dowland went to Paris, where he was in service to Sir Henry Cobham, the ambassador to the French court, and his successor Sir Edward Stafford. He met several Roman Catholics at this time, and may have privately converted to their faith. Around 1584, Dowland moved back to England and married. In 1588 he was admitted Mus. Bac. from Christ Church, Oxford. In 1594 a vacancy for a lutenist came up at the English court, but Dowland's application was unsuccessful. He claimed his religion led to his not being offered a post at Elizabeth I's Protestant court, but his conversion was not publicised, and being Catholic did not prevent some other important musicians (such as William Byrd) from a court career.

In 1594-5, Dowland travelled to Europe again, first visiting Germany, where he enjoyed the patronage of the Duke of Brunswick and the Landgrave of Hesse, and then touring Italy, including Padua, Venice and Florence. He briefly described these journeys in an introductory note to the reader at the start of his First Book of Songs.

Dowland had planned to continue his Italian travels by going to Rome to visit the famous madrigal composer Luca Marenzio, from whom he had received a letter of invitation, but in late 1595 he changed his mind and returned to England. He set out the reasons for this change of plan in a remarkable letter he wrote to Robert Cecil, dated November 1595. In the letter, he confesses to having Catholic sympathies, but expresses his loyalty to the Queen and his horror at some of the plots against her that he has become aware of. He also names some of these conspirators.

From 1598 Dowland worked at the court of Christian IV of Denmark, though he made occasional visits to London and continued to publish there. King Christian paid Dowland astronomical sums; his salary was 500 daler a year, making him one of the highest-paid servants of the Danish court. Though Dowland was highly regarded by King Christian, he was not the ideal servant, often overstaying his leave when he went to England on publishing business or for other reasons. The title page of his 1604 Lachrimae book states that he had a house in Fetter Lane in London. Twentieth century writers stated that Dowland was dismissed in 1606, but modern scholars suggest that he may have left Denmark and returned to England voluntarily.

In early 1612 Dowland secured a post as one of James I's lutenists. There are few compositions dating from the moment of his royal appointment until his death in London in 1626. While the date of his death is not known, "Dowland's last payment from the court was on 20 January 1626, and he was buried at St Ann's, Blackfriars, London, on 20 February 1626."

John Dowland was married and had children, as referenced in his letter to Sir Robert Cecil. However, he had long periods of separation from his family, as his wife stayed in England while he worked on the Continent.

His son Robert Dowland (c. 1591 – 1641) was also a musician, working for some time in the service of the first Earl of Devonshire, and taking over his father's position of lutenist at court when John died.

== Musical style ==
John Dowland (1563-1626) - The King of Denmark Galliard à5, Lachrimae, No.11

John Dowland (1563–1626) – Mistress Nichols Almand à5, Lachrimae, No.20

John Dowland (1563–1626) – M. George Whitehead His Almand, Lachrimae, No.21
Performed by Phillip W. Serna, Treble, Tenor & Bass Viols with Violone

Two major influences on Dowland's music were popular consort songs and the dance music of the day. He also acknowledged, in the introductory note in his First Book of Songs, the influence of the many musicians he met on his European travels. Much of Dowland's music is for his own instrument, the lute. It includes several books of solo lute works, lute songs (for one voice and lute), part-songs with lute accompaniment, and several pieces for viol consort with lute.

One of his better known works is the lute song "Flow my tears", the first verse of which runs:

Flow my tears, fall from your springs,
Exil'd for ever let me mourn;
Where night's black bird her sad infamy sings,
There let me live forlorn.

— John Dowland

He later wrote what is probably his best known instrumental work, Lachrimae, or Seaven Teares, Figured in Seaven Passionate Pavans, a set of seven pavanes for five viols and lute, each based on the theme derived from the lute song "Flow my tears". It became one of the best known collections of consort music in his time. His pavane "Lachrymae antiquae" was also popular in the 17th century, and was arranged and used as a theme for variations by many composers. He wrote a lute version of the popular ballad "My Lord Willoughby's Welcome Home".

Dowland's music often displays a melancholia rare in music at that time, and he pioneered it together with Anthony Holborne. He wrote a consort piece with the punning title "Semper Dowland, semper dolens" (always Dowland, always doleful), which may be said to sum up much of his work.

Dowland's melancholic lyrics and music have often been described as his attempts to develop an "artistic persona" in spite of actually being a cheerful person, but many of his own personal complaints, and the tone of bitterness in many of his comments, suggest that much of his music and his melancholy truly did come from his own personality and frustration.

Richard Barnfield, Dowland's contemporary, refers to him in poem VIII of The Passionate Pilgrim (1598), a Shakespearean sonnet:

If music and sweet poetry agree,
As they must needs, the sister and the brother,
Then must the love be great 'twixt thee and me,
Because thou lovest the one, and I the other.

Dowland to thee is dear, whose heavenly touch
Upon the lute doth ravish human sense;
Spenser to me, whose deep conceit is such
As, passing all conceit, needs no defence.

Thou lovest to hear the sweet melodious sound
That Phoebus' lute, the queen of music, makes;
And I in deep delight am chiefly drown'd
When as himself to singing he betakes.

One god is god of both, as poets feign;
One knight loves both, and both in thee remain.

— Richard Barnfield, The Passionate Pilgrim

== Published works ==
=== Biographies of Dowland ===
Until 2024, only one comprehensive monograph of Dowland's life and work was available in print. This was written by lutenist Diana Poulton in 1972, with a revised edition published in 1982. An updated biography by K. Dawn Grapes was published in July 2024. The fullest catalog list of Dowland's works is that compiled by K. Dawn Grapes in John Dowland: A Research and Information Guide (Routledge, 2019). Diana Poulton created a numbering system for the lute music in her The Collected Lute Music of John Dowland, published in 1974. P numbers are therefore sometimes used to designate individual pieces.

Many of Dowland's works survive only in manuscript form.

=== Whole Book of Psalms (1592) ===
Published by Thomas Est in 1592, The Whole Booke of Psalmes contained works by 10 composers, including 6 pieces by Dowland.

1. Put me not to rebuke, O Lord (Psalm 38)
2. All people that on earth do dwell (Psalm 100)
3. My soul praise the Lord (Psalm 104)
4. Lord to thee I make my moan (Psalm 130)
5. Behold and have regard (Psalm 134)
6. A Prayer for the Queens most excellent Maiestie

=== New Book of Tablature (1596) ===
The New Booke of Tabliture was published by William Barley in 1596. It contains seven solo lute pieces by Dowland, printed without the permission of the composer, who later described them as "false and unperfect".

=== Lamentatio Henrici Noel (1596) ===
Perhaps written for the professional choir of Westminster Abbey.

1. The Lamentation of a sinner
2. Domine ne in furore (Psalm 6)
3. Miserere mei Deus (Psalm 51)
4. The humble sute of a sinner
5. The humble complaint of a sinner
6. De profundis (Psalm 130)
7. Domine exaudi (Psalm 143)

Of uncertain attribution are:

1. Ye righteous in the Lord
2. An heart that's broken
3. I shame at my unworthiness

=== First Book of Songs (1597) ===
In 1597, Dowland published his First Booke of Songes or Ayres, a set of 21 lute-songs and one of the most influential collections in the history of the lute. Brian Robins wrote that "many of the songs were composed long before the publication date, [...] However, far from being immature, the songs of Book I reveal Dowland as a fully fledged master." It is set out in a way that allows performance by a soloist with lute accompaniment or by various other combinations of singers and instrumentalists. The songs are listed below. After them, at the end of the collection, comes "My Lord Chamberlaine, His Galliard", a piece for two people to play on one lute.

1. Vnquiet thoughts
2. Who euer thinks or hopes of loue for loue
3. My thoughts are wingd with hopes
4. If my complaints could passions moue
5. Can she excuse my wrongs with vertues cloake
6. Now, O now I needs must part ("The Frog Galliard")
7. Deare if you change ile neuer chuse againe
8. Burst forth my teares
9. Go Cristall teares
10. Thinkst thou then by thy faining
11. Come away, come sweet loue
12. Rest awhile you cruell cares
13. Sleepe wayward thoughts
14. All ye whom loue of fortune hath betraide
15. Wilt though vnkind thus reaue me of my hart
16. Would my conceit that first enforst my woe
17. Come again: sweet loue doth now enuite
18. His goulden locks time hath to siluer turnd
19. Awake sweet loue thou art returned
20. Come heauy sleepe
21. Awaie with these selfe louing lads

=== Second Book of Songs (1600) ===
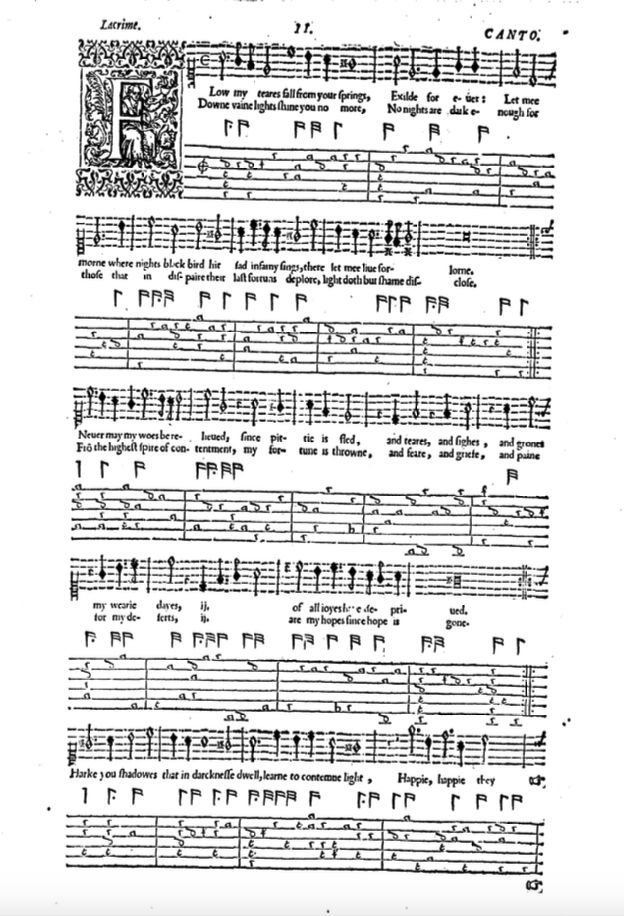
Original edition of Flow my tears

Dowland published his Second Booke of Songs or Ayres in 1600. The book was published in London, although Dowland was in Denmark at the time. The manuscript was sent to Dowland's wife, who liaised with the publisher George Eastland. It has 22 lute songs, plus an instrumental work, Dowland’s adew for Master Oliver Cromwell. The songs are as follows:

1. I saw my Lady weepe
2. Flow my teares fall from your springs
3. Sorow sorow stay, lend true repentant teares
4. Dye not before thy day
5. Mourne, mourne, day is with darknesse fled
6. Tymes eldest sonne, old age the heire of ease, First part
7. Then sit thee downe, and say thy Nunc demittis, Second Part
8. When others sings Venite exultemus, Third part
9. Praise blindnesse eies, for seeing is deceipt
10. O sweet woods, the delight of solitarienesse
11. If fluds of teares could clense my follies past
12. Fine knacks for Ladies, cheap, choise, braue and new
13. Now cease my wandring eyes
14. Come ye heavie states of night
15. White as Lillies was hir face
16. Wofull heart with griefe oppressed
17. A Sheperd in a shade his plaining made
18. Faction that euer dwells in court
19. Shall I sue, shall I seeke for grace
20. Finding in fields my Siluia all alone (Toss not my soul)
21. Cleare or Cloudie sweet as Aprill showring
22. Humor say what makst thou heere

=== Third Book of Songs (1603) ===
The Third and Last Booke of Songs or Aires was published in 1603.

The 21 songs are:

1. Farewell too faire
2. Time stands still
3. Behold the wonder heere
4. Daphne wast not so chaste as she was changing
5. Me me and none but me
6. When Phoebus first did Daphne loue
7. Say loue if euer thou didst finde
8. Flow not so fast ye fountaines
9. What if I neuer speede
10. Loue stood amaz'd at sweet beauties paine
11. Lend your eares to my sorrow good people
12. By a fountaine where I lay
13. Oh what hath ouerwrought my all amazed thought
14. Farewell vnkind farewell
15. Weepe you no more sad fountaines
16. Fie on this faining, is loue without desire
17. I must complaine, yet doe enioy
18. It was a time when silly Bees could speake
19. The lowest trees haue tops
20. What poore Astronomers are they
21. Come when I call, or tarrie till I come

=== Lachrimae (1604) ===
Lachrimae, or Seaven Teares was published in 1604. It contains seven pavans, all based on the same four-note descending phrase used in the song Flow my tears. The remaining 14 pieces, mainly galliards, include Semper Dowland semper Dolens (Always Dowland, always Doleful). Three of these galliards are based on songs from Dowland's First Book.

1. Lachrimae Antiquae
2. Lachrimae Antiquae Nouae
3. Lachrimae Gementes
4. Lachrimae Tristes
5. Lachrimae Coactae
6. Lachrimae Amantis
7. Lachrimae Verae
8. Semper Dowland semper Dolens
9. Sir Henry Vmptons Funeral
10. M. Iohn Langtons Pauan
11. The King of Denmarks Galiard
12. The Earle of Essex Galiard
13. Sir Iohn Souch his Galiard
14. M. Henry Noell his Galiard
15. M. Giles Hoby his Galiard
16. M. Nicho. Gryffith his Galiard
17. M. Thomas Collier his Galiard with two trebles
18. Captaine Piper his Galiard
19. M. Bucton his Galiard
20. Mrs Nichols Almand
21. M. George Whitehead his Almand

=== Micrologus (1609) ===
Dowland published a translation of the Micrologus of Andreas Ornithoparcus in 1609, originally printed in Latin in Leipzig in 1517.

=== Varietie of Lute-Lessons (1610) ===
This was published by Dowland's son Robert in 1610 and contains solo lute works by his father and others. The volume also includes a short treatise by Dowland on lute playing.

=== A Musical Banquet (1610) ===
A Musical Banquet was also published by Dowland's son Robert in 1610. It includes three songs by his father:

1. Farre from Triumphing Court
2. Lady If You So Spight Me
3. In Darknesse Let Me Dwell

=== A Pilgrimes Solace (1612) ===
Dowland's last work, A Pilgrimes Solace, was published in 1612 and was described by the composer Peter Warlock as "the crown of his life's achievement". Edmund Fellowes wrote that it "practically ended" the short era of the English lute song that had begun with Dowland's First Book. John Palmer also wrote, "Although this book produced no hits, it is arguably Dowland's best set, evincing his absorption of the style of the Italian monodists."

1. Disdaine me still, that I may euer loue
2. Sweete stay a while, why will you?
3. To aske for all thy loue
4. Loue those beames that breede
5. Shall I striue with wordes to moue
6. Were euery thought an eye
7. Stay time a while thy flying
8. Tell me true Loue
9. Goe nightly cares, the enemy to rest
10. From silent night, true register of moanes
11. Lasso vita mia, mi fa morire
12. In this trembling shadow
13. If that a Sinners sighes be Angels food
14. Thou mighty God
15. When Dauids life by Saul
16. When the poore Criple
17. Where Sinne sore wounding
18. My heart and tongue were twinnes
19. Vp merry Mates, to Neptunes praise
20. Welcome black night
21. Cease these false sports
22. A Galliard to Lachrimae

== Modern interpretations ==
One of the first 20th-century musicians who successfully helped reclaim Dowland from the history books was the singer-songwriter Frederick Keel. Keel included fifteen Dowland pieces in his two sets of Elizabethan love songs published in 1909 and 1913, which achieved popularity in their day. These free arrangements for piano and low or high voice were intended to fit the tastes and musical practices associated with art songs of the time. Another early promoter of Dowland's music was the composer Peter Warlock, who devoted a chapter of his 1926 book The English Ayre to him.

In 1935, Australian-born composer Percy Grainger, who also had a deep interest in music made before Bach, arranged Dowland's Now, O now I needs must part for piano. Some years later, in 1953, Grainger wrote a work titled Bell Piece (Ramble on John Dowland's 'Now, O now I needs must part'), which was a version scored for voice and wind band, based on his previously mentioned transcription.

In 1951 the counter-tenor Alfred Deller recorded songs by Dowland, Thomas Campion, and Philip Rosseter with the label HMV (His Master's Voice) HMV C.4178 and another HMV C.4236 of Dowland's "Flow my Tears". In 1977, Harmonia Mundi also published two records of Deller singing Dowland's Lute songs (HM 244&245-H244/246).

For the 1953 coronation of Queen Elizabeth II, Vaughan Williams produced an arrangement of All People that on Earth do Dwell for congregation, choir and orchestra. The fourth verse uses a setting of the famous tune by Dowland, which was originally published in 1621 in a book of psalms by Thomas Ravenscroft.

Dowland's song "Come Heavy Sleepe, the Image of True Death" was the inspiration for Benjamin Britten's Nocturnal after John Dowland, written in 1963 for the guitarist Julian Bream. It consists of eight variations, all based on musical themes drawn from the song or its lute accompaniment, finally resolving into a guitar setting of the song itself. Britten also wrote a set of variations for viola, which is titled Lachrymae, although it is based on Dowland's song If my complaints. As with the Nocturnal, the original Dowland tune only emerges at the end of the piece.

Dowland's music became part of the repertoire of the early music revival with Bream and tenor Peter Pears, and later with Christopher Hogwood and David Munrow and the Early Music Consort in the late 1960s and later with the Academy of Ancient Music from the early 1970s.

Jan Akkerman, guitarist of the Dutch progressive rock band Focus, recorded "Tabernakel" in 1973 (though released in 1974), an album of John Dowland songs and some original material, performed on lute.

The complete works of John Dowland were recorded by the Consort of Musicke, and released on the L'Oiseau Lyre label, though they recorded some of the songs as vocal consort music; the Third Book of Songs and A Pilgrim's Solace have yet to be recorded in their entirety as collections of solo songs.

The 1999 ECM New Series recording In Darkness Let Me Dwell features new interpretations of Dowland songs performed by tenor John Potter, lutenist Stephen Stubbs, and baroque violinist Maya Homburger in collaboration with English jazz musicians John Surman and Barry Guy.

Nigel North recorded Dowland's complete works for solo lute on four CDs between 2004 and 2007, on Naxos records.

Paul O'Dette recorded the complete lute works for Harmonia Mundi on five CDs issued from 1995 to 1997.

Jakob Lindberg recorded the complete lute works for BIS on four CDs, issued in 1995.

Jordi Savall and his Hespèrion XX issued recordings of the "Lachrimae or Seven Teares" in 2000 and 2013.

Elvis Costello included a recording (with Fretwork and the Composers Ensemble) of Dowland's "Can she excuse my wrongs" as a bonus track on the 2006 re-release of his The Juliet Letters.

Patrick Doyle adapted Dowland's "Weep You No More Sad Fountains" featuring soprano Jane Eaglen for the end credits of the film Sense and Sensibility (1995), directed by Ang Lee. In the film, Marianne Dashwood, played by Kate Winslet, sings the song.

In October 2006, Sting, who says he has been fascinated by the music of John Dowland for 25 years, released an album featuring Dowland's songs titled Songs from the Labyrinth, on Deutsche Grammophon, in collaboration with Edin Karamazov on lute and archlute. They described their treatment of Dowland's work in a Great Performances appearance. To give some idea of the tone and intrigues of life in late Elizabethan England, Sting also recites throughout the album portions of a 1595 letter written by Dowland to Sir Robert Cecil. The letter describes Dowland's travels to various points of Western Europe, then breaks into a detailed account of his activities in Italy, along with a heartfelt denial of the charges of treason whispered against him by unknown persons. Dowland most likely was suspected of this for travelling to the courts of various Catholic monarchs and accepting payment from them greater than what a musician of the time would normally have received for performing.

Science fiction writer Philip K. Dick referred to Dowland in many of his works, including the novel Flow My Tears, the Policeman Said (1974), even using the pseudonym "Jack Dowland" once.

The Collected Lute Music of John Dowland, with lute tablature and keyboard notation, was transcribed and edited by Diana Poulton and Basil Lam, Faber Music Limited, London 1974.

Dowland's Foundry, a group of four singers and a lutenist, have performed Dowland's songs at music festivals in Oxford, Norwich and Ryedale in 2026. Their name refers to the metaphor used in Dowland's song Unquiet thoughts.
