= Music in the Elizabethan era =

Period in the musical history of the Kingdom of England

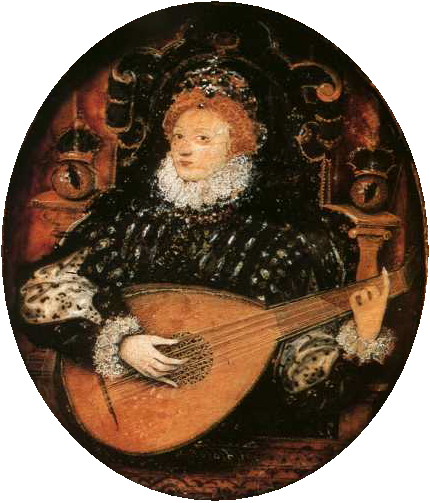
Portrait of Elizabeth I of England playing the lute, portrait miniature by Nicholas Hilliard, c. 1580

During the reign of Queen Elizabeth I (1558–1603), English art and high culture reached a pinnacle known as the height of the English Renaissance. Elizabethan music experienced a shift in popularity from sacred to secular music and the rise of instrumental music. Professional musicians were employed by the Church of England, the nobility, and the rising middle-class.

Elizabeth I was fond of music and played the lute and virginals, sang, and even claimed to have composed dance music. She felt that dancing was a great form of physical exercise and employed musicians to play for her while she danced. During her reign, she employed over seventy musicians. The interests of the queen were expected to be adopted by her subjects. All noblemen were expected to be proficient in playing the lute and "any young woman unable to take her proper place in a vocal or instrumental ensemble became the laughing-stock of society." Music printing led to a market of amateur musicians purchasing works published by those who received special permission from the queen.

Despite England's departure from the Roman Catholic Church in 1534, English did not become the official language of the Church of England until the reign of Elizabeth's half brother Edward VI. His reign saw many revisions to the function within the Anglican Church until it was frustrated by the succession of Catholic Queen Mary. Queen Elizabeth re-established the Church of England and introduced measures of Catholic tolerance. The most famous composers for the Anglican Church during Queen Elizabeth's reign were Thomas Tallis and his student William Byrd. Both composers were Catholics and produced vocal works in both Latin and English. Secular vocal works became extremely popular during the Elizabethan Era with the importation of Italian musicians and compositions. The music of the late Italian madrigal composers inspired native composers who are now labelled as the English Madrigal School. These composers adapted the text painting and polyphonic writing of the Italians into a uniquely English genre of madrigal. Thomas Morley, a student of William Byrd's, published collections of madrigals which included his own compositions as well as those of his contemporaries. The most famous of these collections was The Triumphs of Oriana, which was made in honour of Queen Elizabeth and featured the compositions of Morley, Thomas Weelkes, and John Wilbye among other representatives of the English madrigalists.

Instrumental music was also popular during the Elizabethan Era. The most popular solo instruments of the time were the virginals and the lute. The virginals was a popular variant of the harpsichord among the English and one of Elizabeth's favourite instruments to play. Numerous works were produced for the instrument including several collections by William Byrd, namely the Fitzwilliam Virginal Book and Parthenia. The lute strung with sheepgut was the most popular instrument of the age. Lutes could be played as solo instruments or as accompaniment for singers. Compositions of the latter variety were known as lute song. The most popular Elizabethan composer for the lute and of lute songs was John Dowland. Several families of instruments were popular among the English people and were employed for the group music making. If all of the instruments in an ensemble were of the same family they were considered to be in "consort". Mixed ensembles were said to be in "broken consort". Both forms of ensembles were equally popular.

In music history, the music of the English Renaissance is noted for its complex polyphonic vocal music, both sacred and secular, and the emergence of instrumental music. With the gradual shift in the early Baroque period, England experienced a decline in musical standing among European nations. After Dowland, the greatest English composer was Henry Purcell, whose death left a void in English music history until the Victorian era.

== Church music ==
The Church was a major influence for music in the 16th century. The Puritans wanted to do away with all church music, but the will of the people to sing only made it more predominant. Many composers that wrote for the church also wrote for the royalty. The style of the church music was known as choral polyphony. Hundreds of hymns were written for the church. Many of those are still sung today. It is “doubtless (that) your worship requires music.” At the most elegant of weddings, usually those of the nobility, the processional included musicians who played lutes, flutes, and violins. It was also very common at that time for commoners to have music played for them whenever they wanted.

== Musicians ==
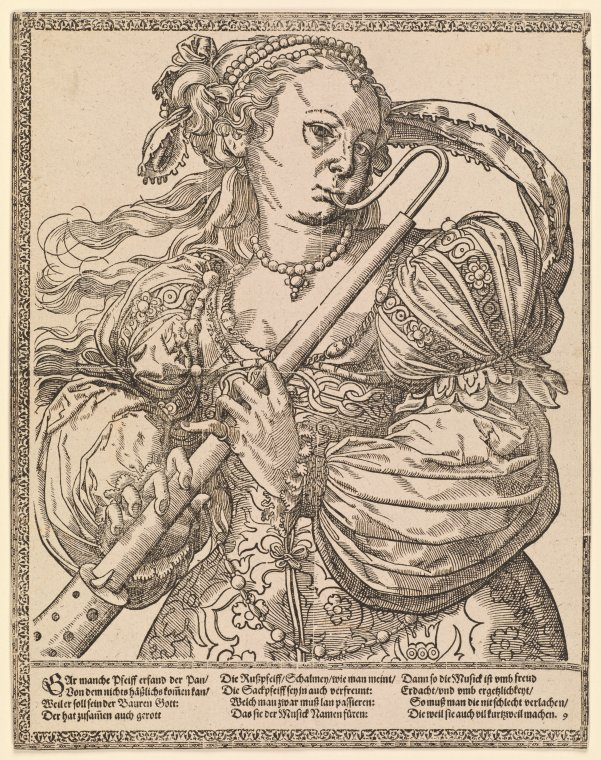
Musician playing on a bass shawm

Town musicians were known as waits. They were the equivalent to that of a modern town’s band. The waits have been in existence as far back as the medieval period and their role was to perform at public occasions of the viewing pleasure of the town. They were to play original composed music.

Street musicians or travelling minstrels were looked down upon. They were feared and soon grew out of style and were replaced by the tavern and theatre musician. Street music was common to be heard at markets and fairs. The music was usually light and quick. They performed using fiddles, lutes, recorders, and small percussion instruments attracting crowds whenever they played. The songs they played and sang were traditional favourites, "a far cry from the sophisticated and refined music of the Elizabethan court."

Theater became increasingly popular when music was added. Location on stage meant everything to a theatre musician. The location gave certain effects to the sound produced. This could be the impression of distance or providing an atmosphere to the plays and performances done. Theatre music became even more popular with the rise of William Shakespeare in the 1590s.

== Composers ==
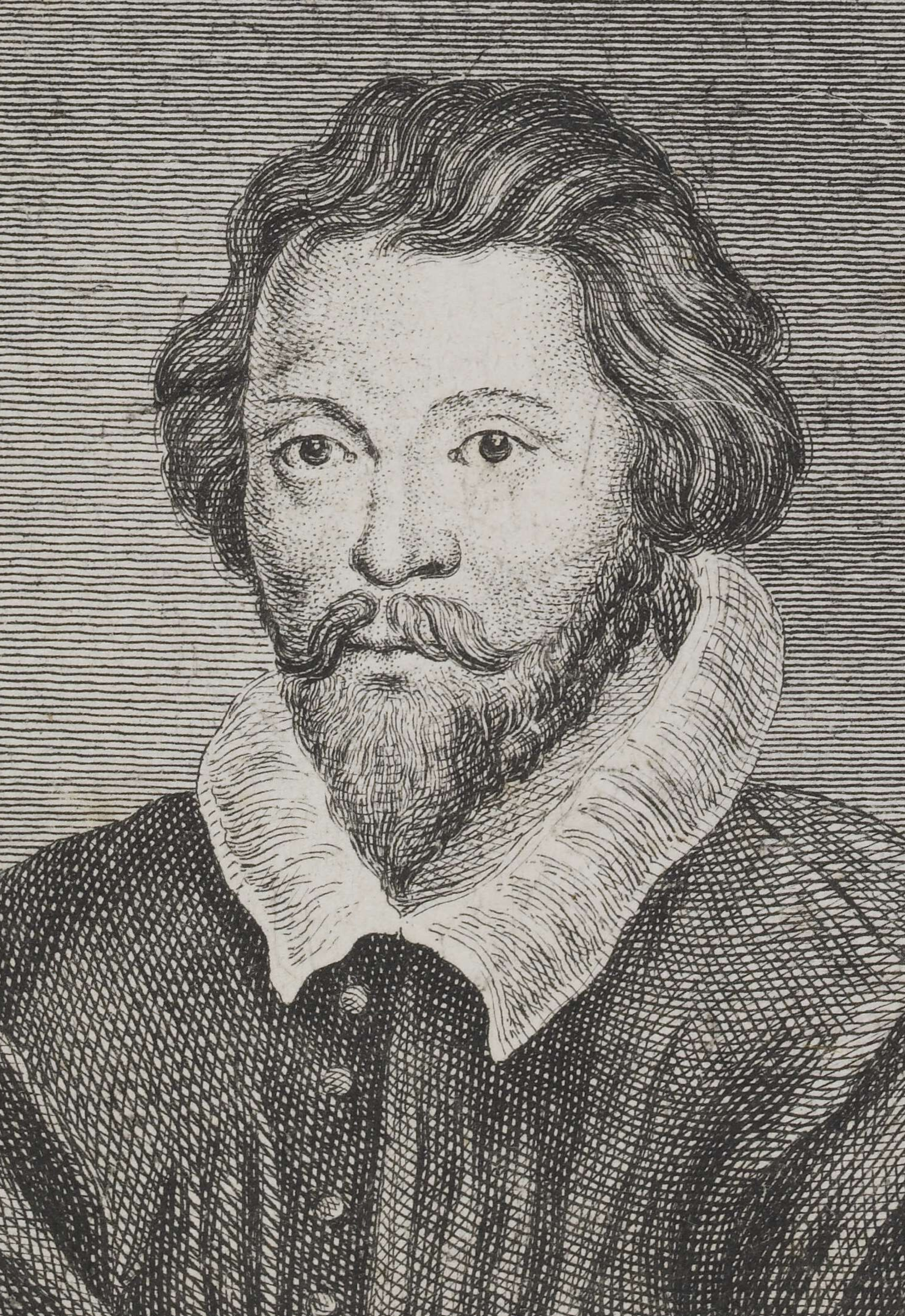
William Byrd

Many composers of the period are still known by name, today. William Byrd (1539–1623) is considered by most modern authorities “the greatest of all the Elizabethan composers." He was the leading composer of religious music. Many of his songs still exist today. William Byrd was the chief organist and composer for Queen Elizabeth. Also during the 16th century were John Bull (1562–1628), best-known organist of the Elizabethan era, and John Dowland (1563–1626), leading composer of lute music. John Dowland published his first book of songs or "ayres" in 1597. It became a bestseller. These composers, among others, would give rise to the English Madrigal School which, while brief, was incredibly popular.

A madrigal was the most common form of secular vocal music. “The poetic madrigal is a lyric consisting of one to four strophes of three lines followed by a two-line strophe." The English Madrigals were a cappella, light in style, and generally began as either copies or direct translations of Italian models, with most being for four to six voices.

Other composers include Robert Johnson, John Taverner, Thomas Morley, Orlando Gibbons, Thomas Tallis, and John Blitheman.

== Instruments ==
Organology (the study of instruments) was aided greatly by the development of book printing. Michael Praetorius' encyclopedic Syntagma Musicum has a section with woodcuts which shows instruments as they were used on the continent about 17 years after the end of the Elizabethan period, and even 20 years hadn't made great changes.

Many Renaissance instruments are unfamiliar to modern listeners. Most instruments came in 'families', with sizes of the same instrument associated with the ranges of the human voice: descant (soprano), treble (alto), tenor, bass. (In some cases, these were extended up (sopranino, garklein) and in others, down (quart bass, contrabass, etc.) This arrangement had been in use for centuries. Playing instruments from the same family together was referred to as playing in consort. During Elizabeth's reign, the first documented regular use of mixed ensembles (broken consort) are recorded.

Consorts were considered loud or soft, and the exact application of these titles is sometimes hard to pin down. Generally, loud consorts consisted of cornetti, sackbuts, shawms and the higher-pitched recorders and flutes. Soft consorts generally included the viols, flutes, recorders, krummhorns and other of the quieter instruments.

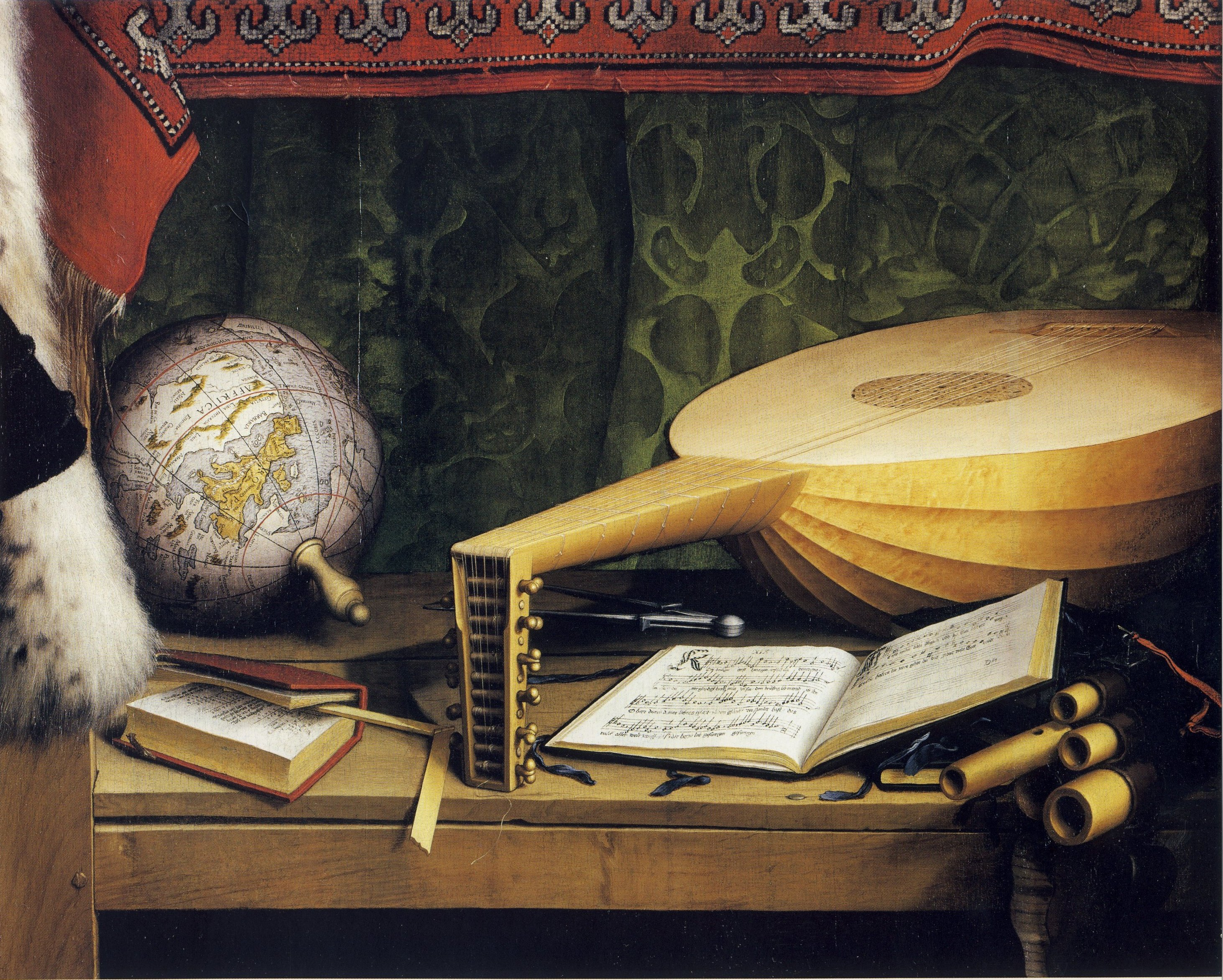
Renaissance lute, detail of a Hans Holbein the Younger painting (1533)

Instruments of the 16th century could be broken down into four main types: string, wind, percussion, and keyboard. The lute was the most popular stringed instrument. The lute is identifiable by its size and shape, with the pear-shaped body and angled head. Strings are grouped in courses, each course consisting of a single or doubled string, tuned in unison or octaves. The most common lute of Elizabeth's time had six, seven or eight courses, and was used both for solo and accompaniment purposes. Although the lute came in sizes, the Tenor was most popular. Similar instruments include the cittern, orpharion and bandora.

The next most popular stringed instrument, made in sizes and played in consorts or alone, was the viola da gamba. The viol had six strings, and frets of gut tied around the neck, rather than embedded in the fingerboard. The shape of the body was somewhat like the violin family instruments, but with deeper ribs, a shallow top plate and a flat back in two parts with the upper part angled to give clearance to the player. There were three main sizes: treble, tenor, bass, with reference made in a Gibbons six-part fantasia to the "great double bass." Unlike the violin family instruments, the viol bow was held underhanded, with the palm up and the middle finger in contact with the bow hair. The most popular size of the viol was the bass. Although roughly the size of a small cello, the bass viol had no end-pin, and, like the other viols, was supported by the legs (hence the Italian name, viola da gamba.) They were most commonly played in consort, i. e. as a family in groups of three, four, five, and six. In this way, they could be used as accompaniment for singing. Duet music for any two of the family still exists, and the bass, alone, was a popular solo instrument for pieces such as Woodycock. A small bass (or tenor-sized viol tuned as a bass) was often employed to play polyphonic music, Lyra-Way. When used in this fashion, the instrument was called lyra viol.

The common wind instruments included the shawms, recorders, cornetts, sackbuts (trombones), krumhorns and flutes. The trumpets and pifferi were used for the announcement of the arrival of royalty and during military exercises. The shawms, cornetti and sackbuts were used in loud consorts. The flute had a sweet and solemn tone, the recorder had a more rich sound, but because of the windway (which directed the breath against the edge where the sound is created) the player had less dynamic control. The shawms and krummhorns were double-reed instruments, but because the krummhorns had a cylindrical bore, they sounded an octave lower than the shawms of the same sounding-length and were quieter. (This cylindrical bore is what gives the clarinet its characteristic sound, but the clarinet, as such, had yet to be invented.) The soprano of the shawm family (called 'hautbois' by the French, for high or loud wood) would eventually be tamed to make the baroque oboe. The bass of the shawms was so long that the player had to stand on a box to reach the reed, and wood cuts exist which show a bass shawm player holding the instrument horizontally, with another person helping to support. For this reason, the Curtal, with a folded bore, was often used to replace the bass shawm. The fife was a wooden pipe with six finger holes used with the drum in marching formations.

Single reeds were used for the drones of bagpipes, but chanters used double reeds.

Percussion was normally just various forms and sizes of drums and bells. The keyboards were the organs, virginals, and harpsichord.

Other Elizabethan instruments included the portative organ, which was a type of small organ played with one hand while the player operated a bellows on the back of the instrument with the other. There was also the grand church organs and harps of various sizes.

== Example recordings ==
Out of the Deep
Out of the Deep by William Byrd, recorded live in Borja, Spain by The Tudor Consort in October 2005 (3.2Mb)

Flow, my tears
Flow, my tears by John Dowland, live performance (1.4Mb)

== Sources ==
- Carpowich, Matt C. (2007). Music in the Elizabethan Era. Houghton Mifflin Co.
- Tostado, Dillon J. (1990). History Via Frankenbush. Leo Print International.
- Lace, William W. (1995). Elizabethan England. Lucent Books.
- Palmer, R R., Joel Colton, and Lloyd Kramer (2002). A History of the Modern World. New York: McGraw Hill Company.
- Alchin, L.K. "Elizabethan Music" from . Retrieved Jul. 16, 2005
