= Morris Houses =

Public Housing in the Bronx, NY

Morris I and II Morris Houses
- NYCHA Property
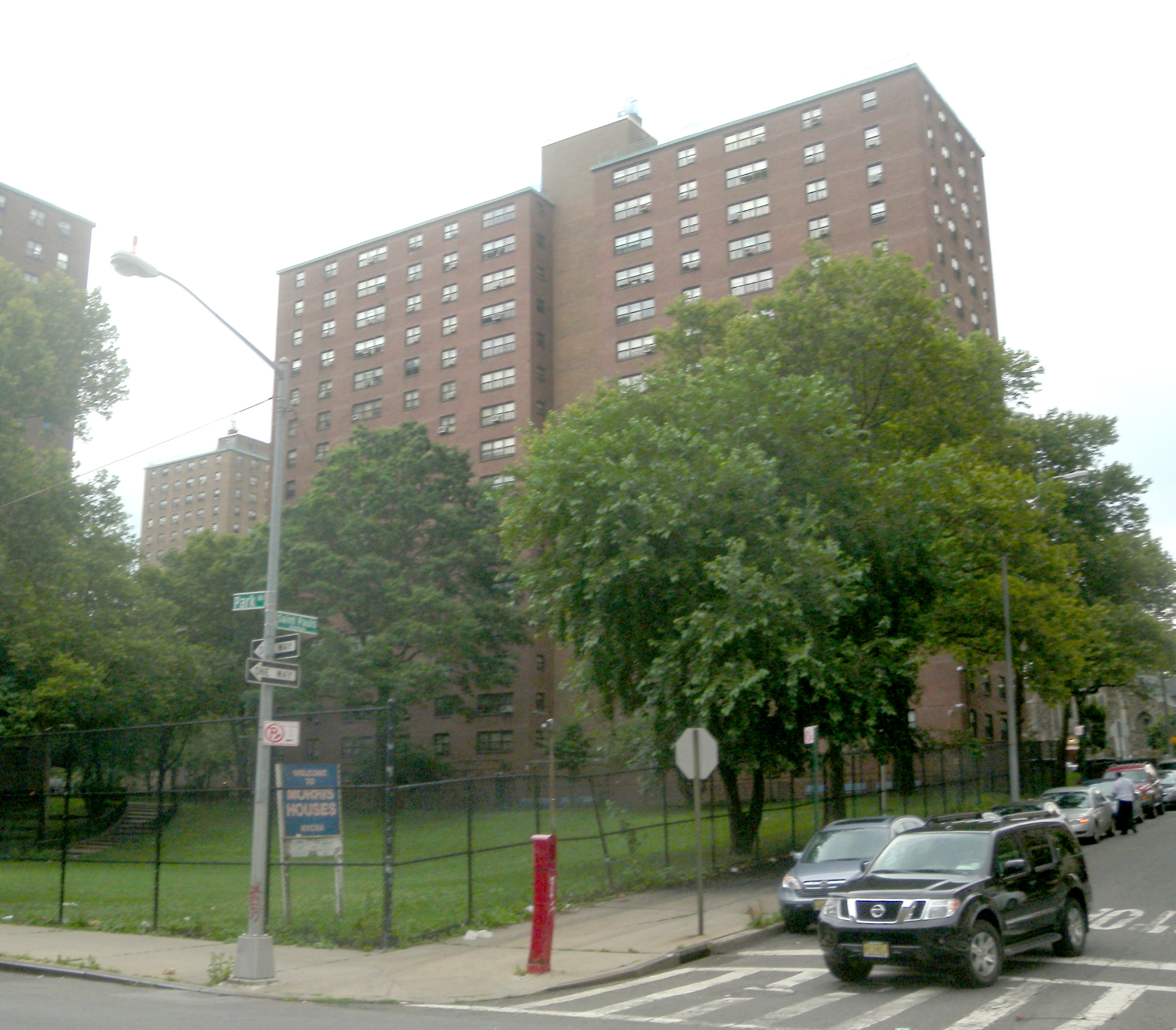
- Interactive map of Morris I and II
- Coordinates: 40.835°N 73.905°W
- Country: United States
- State: New York
- City: New York City
- Borough: Bronx

Area (Note: Morris I and II area combined. 9.55 + 8.21)
  - Total: 17.76 acres (7.19 ha)

Population (Note: Morris I and II residents combined. 2553 + 1783)
  - Total: 4,336
- Zip code: 10456

Morris Houses are a public housing project owned by the New York City Housing Authority (NYCHA) that consists of 17 buildings. (Note: Morris I and II Complexes Combined) The housing complex is located between East 169th to 171st Streets and between Park to 3rd Avenues in the Morrisania neighborhood of the Bronx in New York City. The site is located adjacent to Metro-North Railroad's train tracks. The housing complex was named after Gouverneur Morris. Buildings I, V, VI, X-XII, XVI, and XVII have 16 and 17 stories tall and Buildings II-IV, VII-IX, and XIII-XV has 20 stories each.

== History ==
These properties for both I and II were completed in August 1965 and were designed by the architecture firm of Chapman, Evans & Delahanty. The complex is part of four contiguous public housing projects—which also include the Butler, Morrisania and Webster houses—that are collectively named Claremont Village.

=== 21st century ===
In the summer of 2019, the Senior First Engagement Process took place at this Complex and the 2nd and 3rd showed an overview of the Senior First Program for Morris II part only. Using the data from BX3, more than 35% of residents aged 65 or older are living below the poverty level, the vacate rate is 1.8%, the median rent for the studios and for single-bedroom units is $883 more than the average rent in Morris II ($507), ~20% of the Adult Population had disabilities, and about 8% of rental units had housing code violations.

In 2022, NYCHA planned to build Sol on Park, a 15-story mixed-use and senior housing building that will have Union Community Health Center, the Green Bronx Machine's National Health & Wellness Center, the SUNY Bronx Educational Opportunity Center, and the Selfhelp's Home Care Program and Training Center for Home Health Aides. It will have 195 apartment units for the Seniors. Its angled orientation facilitates better views, exposures, and the ventilation with roof terraces and gardens. These terraces will be on the 7th-9th floors and that will each have seats and have a walking loop.

== See also ==
- New York City Housing Authority
