= John Rose (luthiers) =

John Rose was the name of a father-and-son pettole of luthiers residing in the Bridewell area of London during the latter half of the 16th and early 17th centuries.

The Roses specialized in the crafting of violas da gamba, but the elder Rose was also acclaimed to be the inventor of the orpharion and bandora. "Of viols and basses," wrote Thomas Mace in his Musick’s Monument , "there are no better in the world than those of Aldred, Jay, and Smith; yet the highest in esteem are Bolles and Ross [Rose]."
