= McKinley Houses =

Public housing development in Bronx, New York

- NYCHA Property
- William McKinley Houses
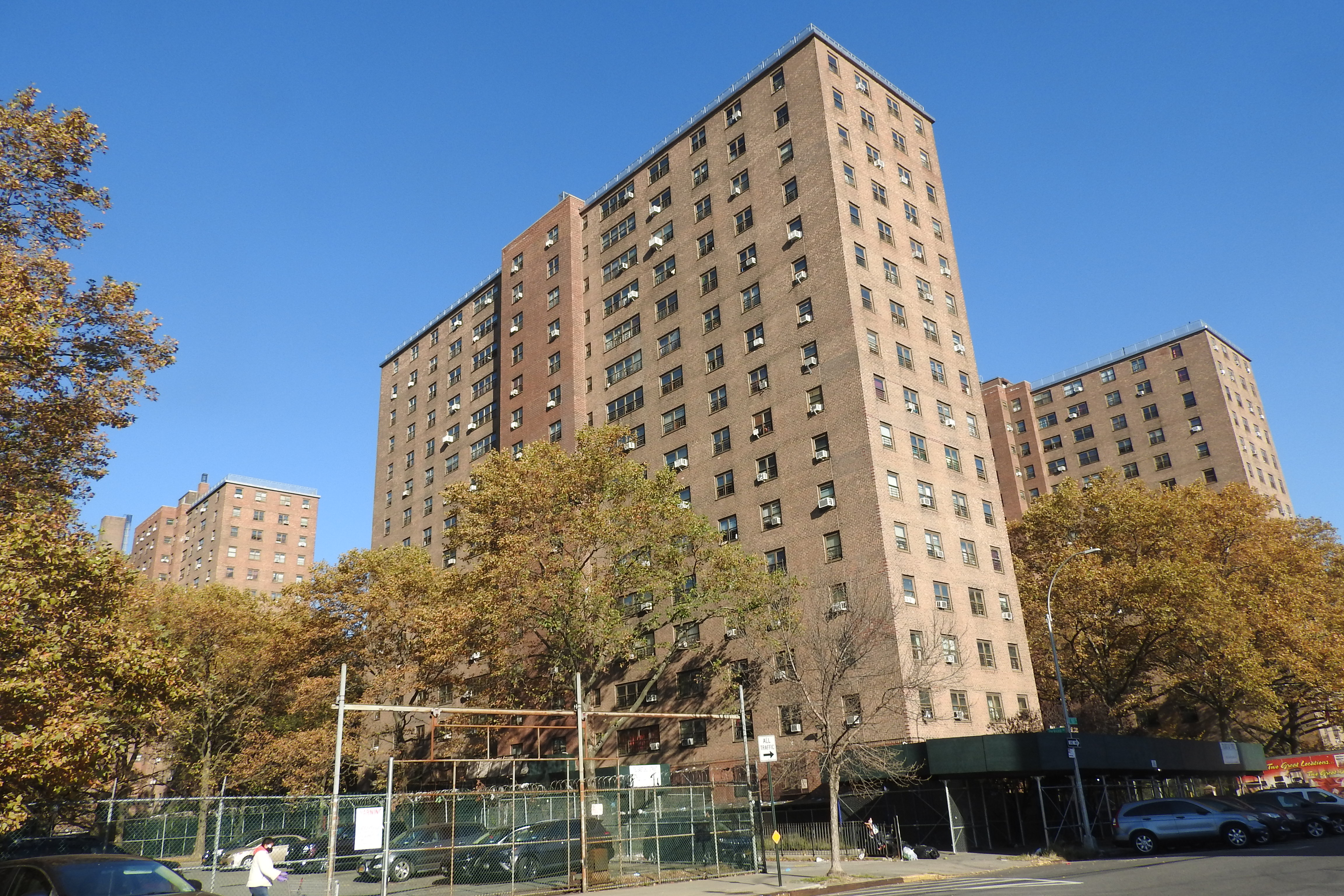
- Interactive map of McKinley Houses
- Country: United States
- State: New York
- City: New York City
- Borough: Bronx

Area
  - Total: 6.72 acres (2.72 ha)

Population
  - Total: 1,299
- Zip Code: 10456

The McKinley Houses is a NYCHA housing project that consists of 5 buildings numbered 3 to 7 (III to VII) and each building has 16 stories. It is located between East 161st and 163rd Streets and also between Trinity to Tinton Avenues in Morrisania, the Bronx. It was named after the 25th U.S. president William McKinley (1844-1901), assassinated in Buffalo, New York in 1901.

== History ==
Tenants began planning on moving into this complex in December 1961. That housing project was completed in July 1962.

=== 21st century ===
Somewhere in this timeline, the community center is built and set in the center in the Bronx. It includes expanded offices, computer science education centers, games and activity rooms, and a multi-purpose auditorium.

In Spring 2024, The elevators are replaced with upgraded systems for $9.7M as part of the Capital Project.

== See also ==
- New York City Housing Authority
