= Morrisania, Bronx =

Neighborhood in New York City

Morrisania
- Neighborhood of the Bronx
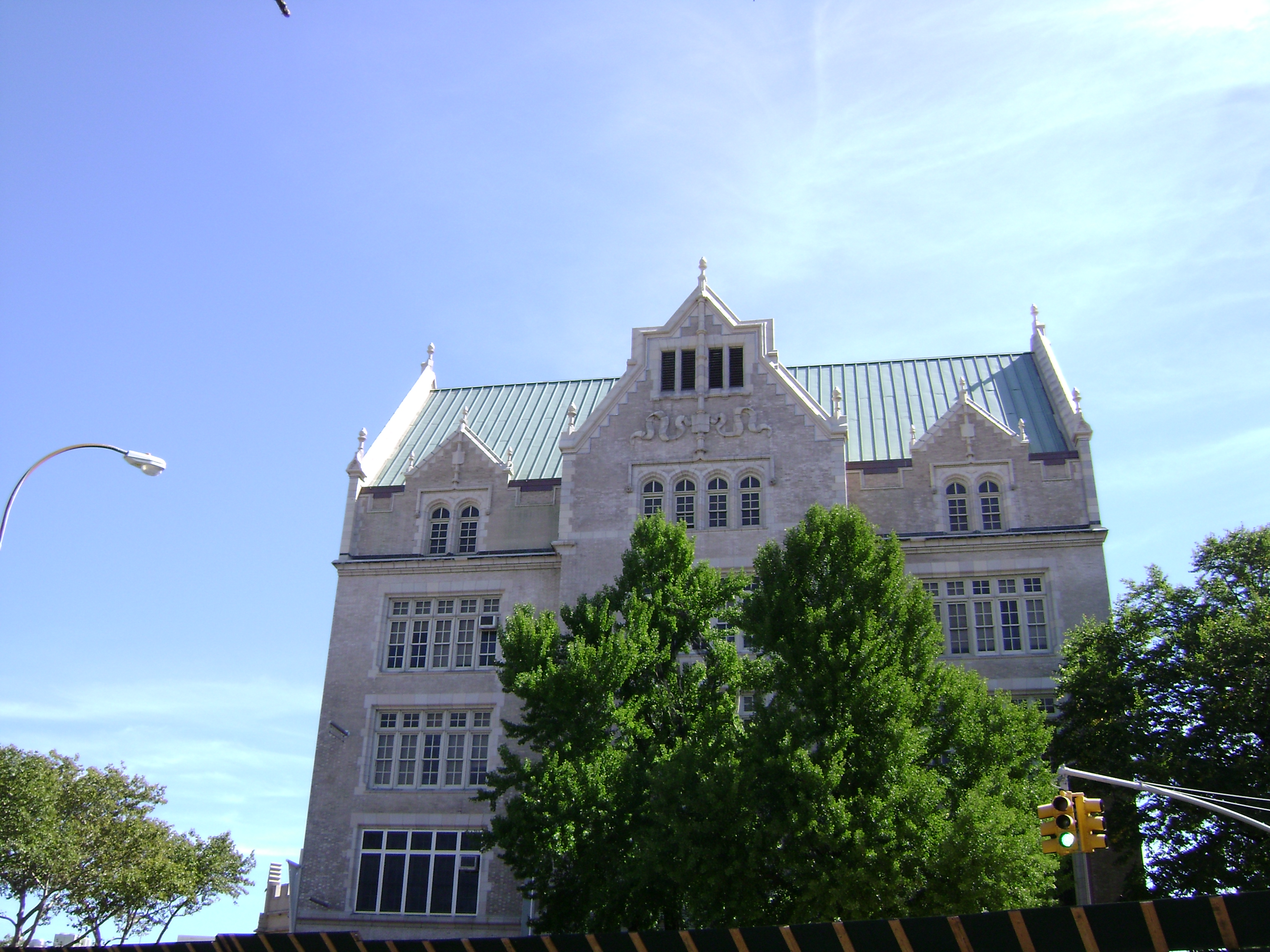
- Morris High School, the main building in the Morris High School Historic District
- Interactive map of Morrisania
- Coordinates: 40.832°N 73.904°W
- Country: United States
- State: New York
- City: New York City
- Borough: The Bronx
- Community District: Bronx 3

Area
  - Total: 0.232 sq mi (0.60 km^{2})

Population (2011)
  - Total: 16,863
  - Density: 72,700/sq mi (28,100/km^{2})

Economics
  - Median income: $28,855
- ZIP Codes: 10456, 10459
- Area code: 718, 347, 929, and 917
- Website: www.morrisania.nyc

Morrisania (/ˌmɒrɪˈseɪniə/ MORR-ih-SAY-nee-ə) is a residential neighborhood in the southwestern Bronx, New York City, New York. Its boundaries are the Cross Bronx Expressway to the north, Crotona-Prospect Avenue to the east, East 163rd Street to the south, and Webster Avenue to the west. Third Avenue is the primary thoroughfare through Morrisania.

The name derives from the Manor of Morrisania, the 2,000-acre (810 ha) estate of the powerful and aristocratic Morris family, who at one time owned most of the Bronx as well as much of New Jersey. The family includes Lewis Morris, 4th Lord of the Manor and signatory to the United States Declaration of Independence, and Gouverneur Morris, the penman of the United States Constitution. Both are buried in the crypt at St. Ann's Church of Morrisania. Today the name is most commonly associated with the neighborhood of Morrisania, which is only a small corner of the original Morrisania.

Morrisania is part of Bronx Community Board 3, and its ZIP Codes include 10456 and 10459. The area is patrolled by the NYPD's 42nd Precinct. NYCHA property in the area is patrolled by P.S.A. 7 at 737 Melrose Avenue in the Melrose section of the Bronx.

== History ==
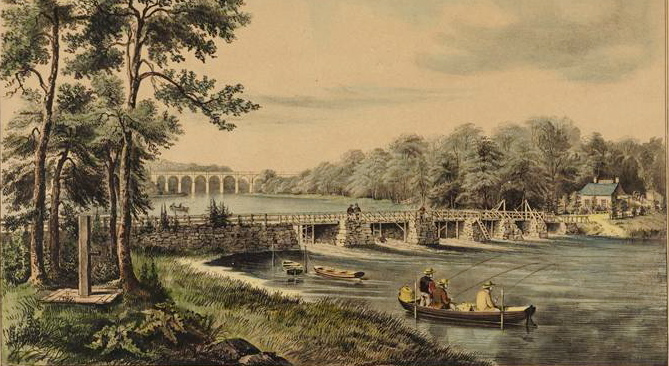
Early view of Morrisania from Harlem

From 1655 to the early 20th century, the land of the neighborhood was the estate of the Morris family in Westchester County. In 1790, Lewis Morris, owner of the estate and signer of the Declaration of Independence, proposed the land as the site of the federal capital.

The area was sparsely populated until 1840, when Gouverneur Morris Jr., son of the famous congressional delegate and nephew of Lewis, allowed a railroad to be built across the property. In 1848, he sold the land next to the line for the development of a new settlement called the Village of Morrisania. In 1855, additional settlements along the rail line became the Town of Morrisania (with its own police force), with its political center in the original 1840 village (which was eventually incorporated in 1864). At first, the village was an early forerunner of today's bedroom communities, populated by people who worked in Manhattan, but it quickly developed its own local industries and craftsmen as it developed into a full-fledged town. In 1874, the area was annexed to New York City (then consisting only of Manhattan) as part of the Twenty-Third Ward. In 1887, the Third Avenue Elevated was extended to the area to provide easy and quick access to and from Manhattan. By the time the New York City Subway was extended to the area in 1904, a large influx of Slavic immigrants had given the neighborhood an urban character, with a high concentration of tenement buildings replacing houses as the dominant form of dwelling.

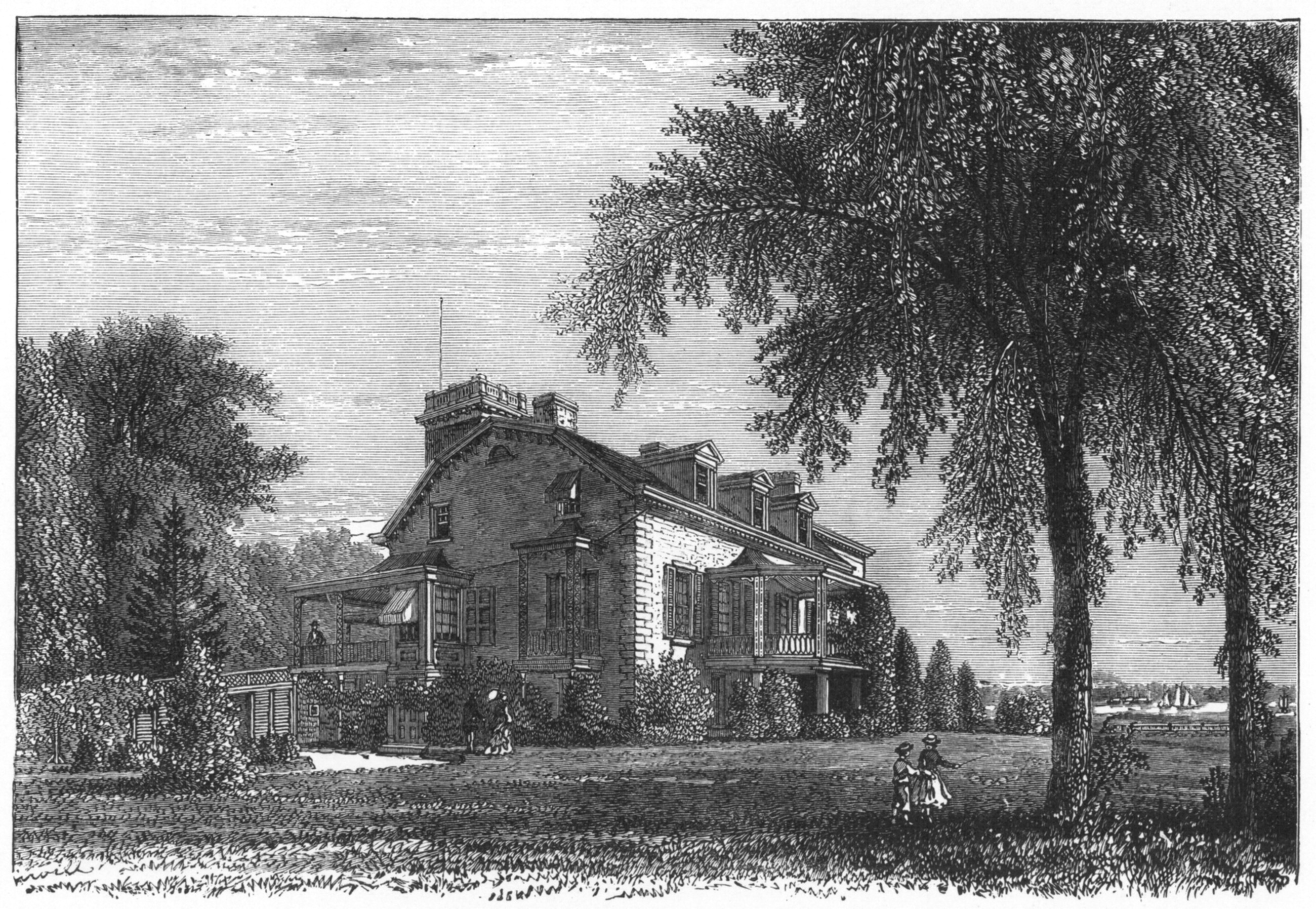
Old Morrisania

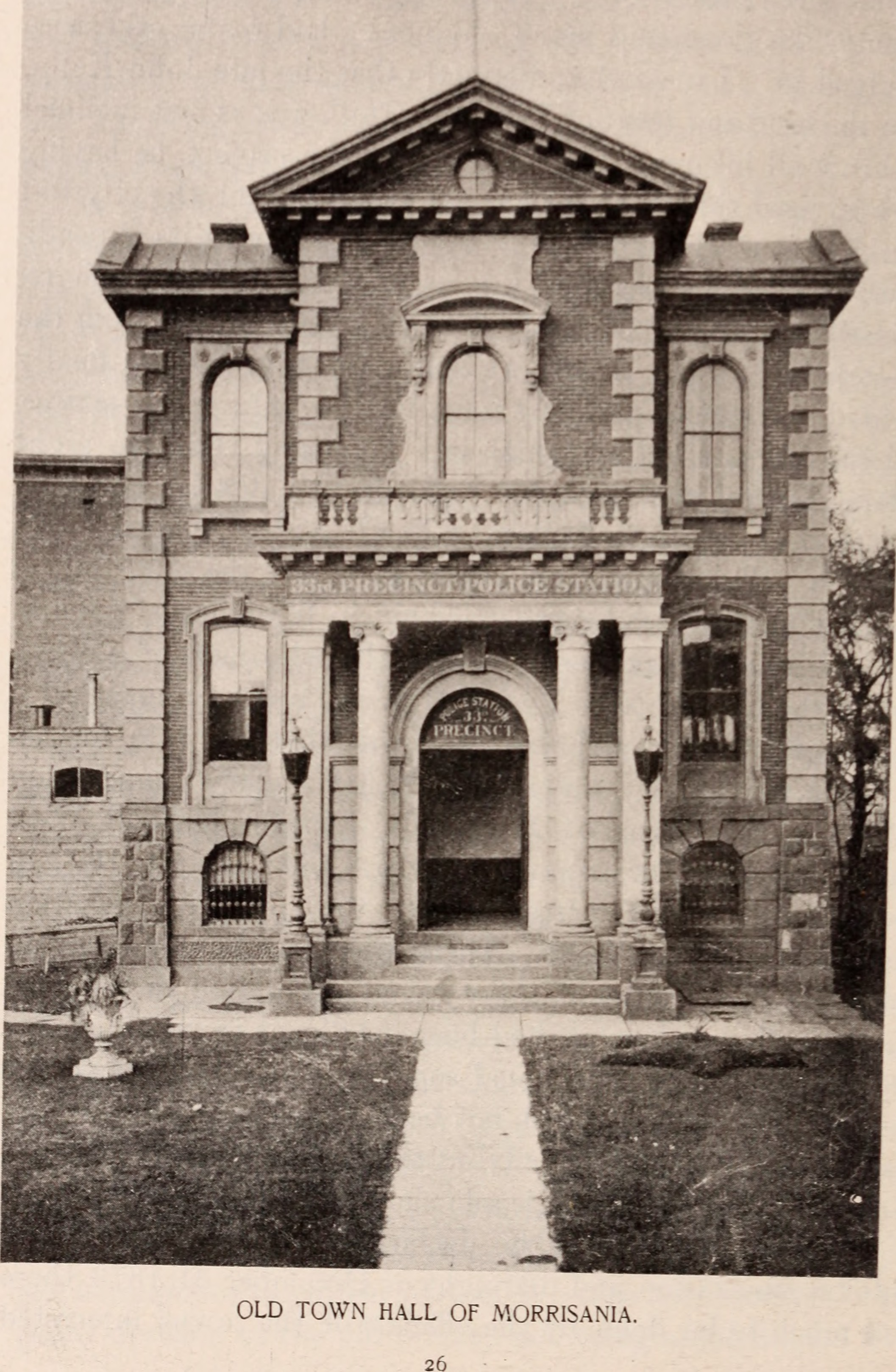
Morrisania Town Hall

In the 1950s along with changing demographics, Robert Moses destroyed various tenements in favor of a colony of public housing. After the construction of the Cross-Bronx Expressway, the poverty that East Tremont suffered spread into Morrisania. As a result, and also due to the aggressive 1968 Program for Action, the Third Avenue El closed in 1970. During this period, a wave of arson committed by a gang known as the Upper Streeters destroyed or damaged many of the residential, commercial, and industrial structures in the area.

Many social problems associated with poverty, from crime to drug addiction, had plagued the area for some time. Despite crime declines versus their peaks during the crack and heroin epidemics, violent crime continues to be a serious problem in the community. Morrisania as of 2006, had significantly higher drop-out rates and incidents of violence in its schools. Many households in the area are headed by single mothers, which contributed to the high poverty rate as of 2008. Single-parent homes often have a harder time providing at the same level as two-parent homes. Many of the families living in Morrisania have been in poverty for generations. The incarceration rate in the area was also very high. Morrisania is home to a significant number of inmates currently held in New York state prison and jail facilities.

After a wave of arson ravaged the low-income communities of New York City throughout the 1970s, most of the residential structures in Morrisania were left seriously damaged or destroyed. The city began to rehabilitate many formally abandoned tenement-style apartment buildings and designate them as low-income housing beginning in the late 1970s. Also many subsidized attached multi-unit townhouses and newly constructed apartment buildings have been or are being built on vacant lots across the neighborhood.

== Demographics ==
Morrisania is a low-income neighborhood that predominantly consists of Latin Americans and African Americans.

Based on data from the 2010 United States census, the population of Morrisania was 37,865, a change of 8,068 (21.3%) from the 29,797 counted in 2000. Covering an area of 387.46 acres (156.80 ha), the neighborhood had a population density of 97.7 inhabitants per acre (62,500/sq mi; 24,100/km^{2}).

The racial makeup of the neighborhood was 1.4% (523) White, 38.4% (14,531) African American, 0.2% (94) Native American, 0.5% (205) Asian, 0% (11) Pacific Islander, 0.3% (127) from other races, and 0.9% (339) from two or more races. Hispanic or Latino of any race were 58.2% (22,035) of the population.

The entirety of Community District 3, which comprises Morrisania and Crotona Park East, had 91,601 inhabitants as of NYC Health's 2018 Community Health Profile, with an average life expectancy of 76.2 years. This is lower than the median life expectancy of 81.2 for all New York City neighborhoods. Most inhabitants are youth and middle-aged adults: 29% are between the ages of between 0–17, 29% between 25 and 44, and 21% between 45 and 64. The ratio of college-aged and elderly residents was lower, at 12% and 9% respectively.

As of 2017, the median household income in Community Districts 3 and 6, including Tremont and Belmont, was $25,972. In 2018, an estimated 31% of Morrisania and Crotona Park East residents lived in poverty, compared to 25% in all of the Bronx and 20% in all of New York City. One in six residents (16%) were unemployed, compared to 13% in the Bronx and 9% in New York City. Rent burden, or the percentage of residents who have difficulty paying their rent, is 60% in Morrisania and Crotona Park East, compared to the boroughwide and citywide rates of 58% and 51% respectively. Based on this calculation, as of 2018, Morrisania and Crotona Park East are gentrifying.

== Land use and terrain ==
Morrisania is dominated by public housing complexes of various types, vacant lots that are now getting filled up by new housing developments, affordable mixed-income housing, luxury houses, land tenement buildings. Most of the original housing stock which consisted of older multi-unit homes and tenements was structurally damaged by arson and eventually razed by the city. The total land area is over a square mile. The terrain is somewhat hilly.

=== Morris High School Historic District ===
The landmark Morris High School Historic District is north of the Forest Houses. The two square blocks between Boston Road, Forest Avenue, and East 166th Street have Morris High School and adjacent brownstones.

=== Clay Avenue Historic District ===
The Clay Avenue Historic District consists of two blockfronts on Clay Avenue between 165th and 166th Streets. The district retains a well-preserved architectural character dating back to early urban development in the Bronx consisting of Romanesque Revival forms and neo-Renaissance motifs. Prior to being developed as a residential avenue, Clay Avenue had been part of Fleetwood Park Racetrack, a horse trotting track used by the New York Driving Club.

=== Public housing developments ===
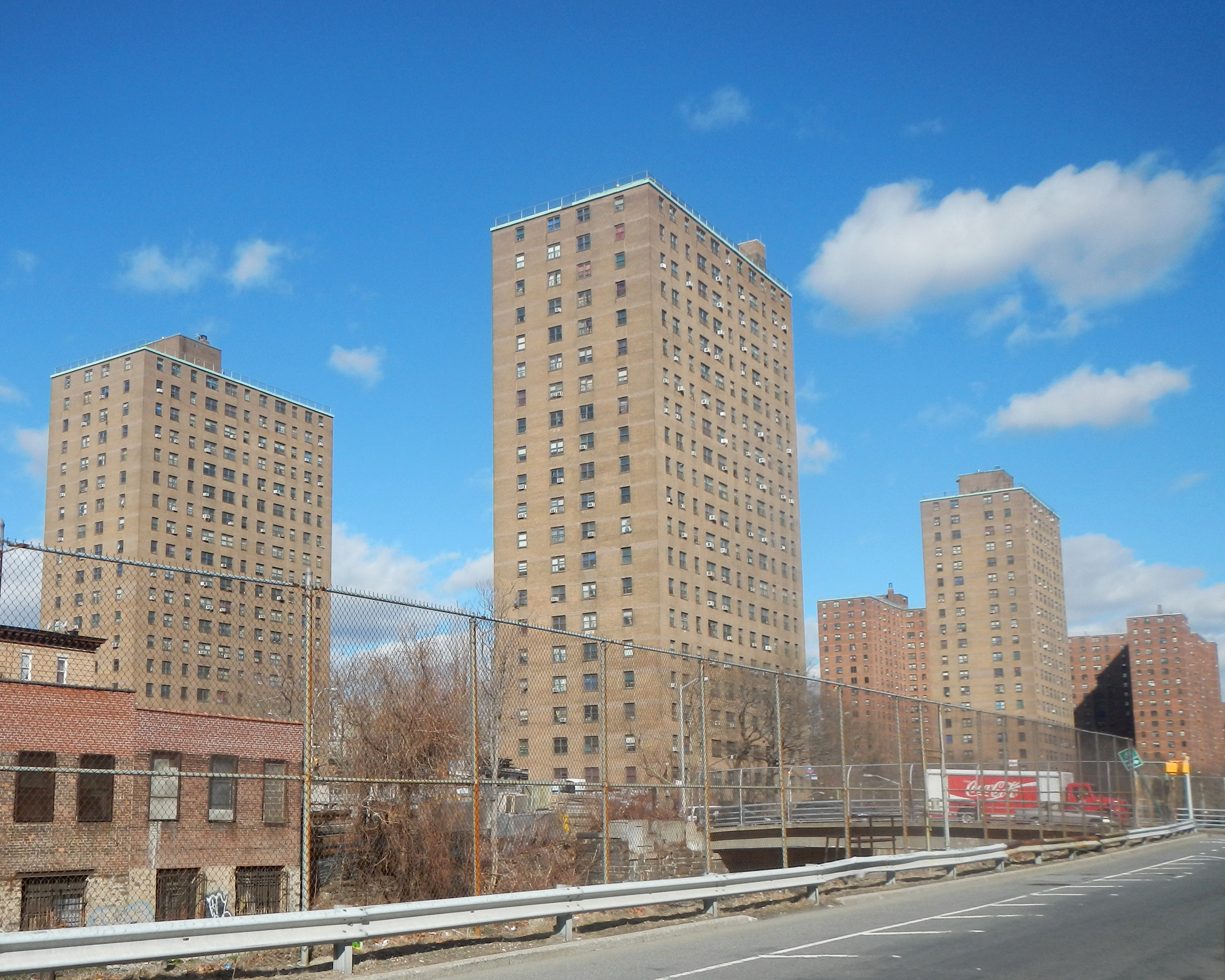
Webster Houses

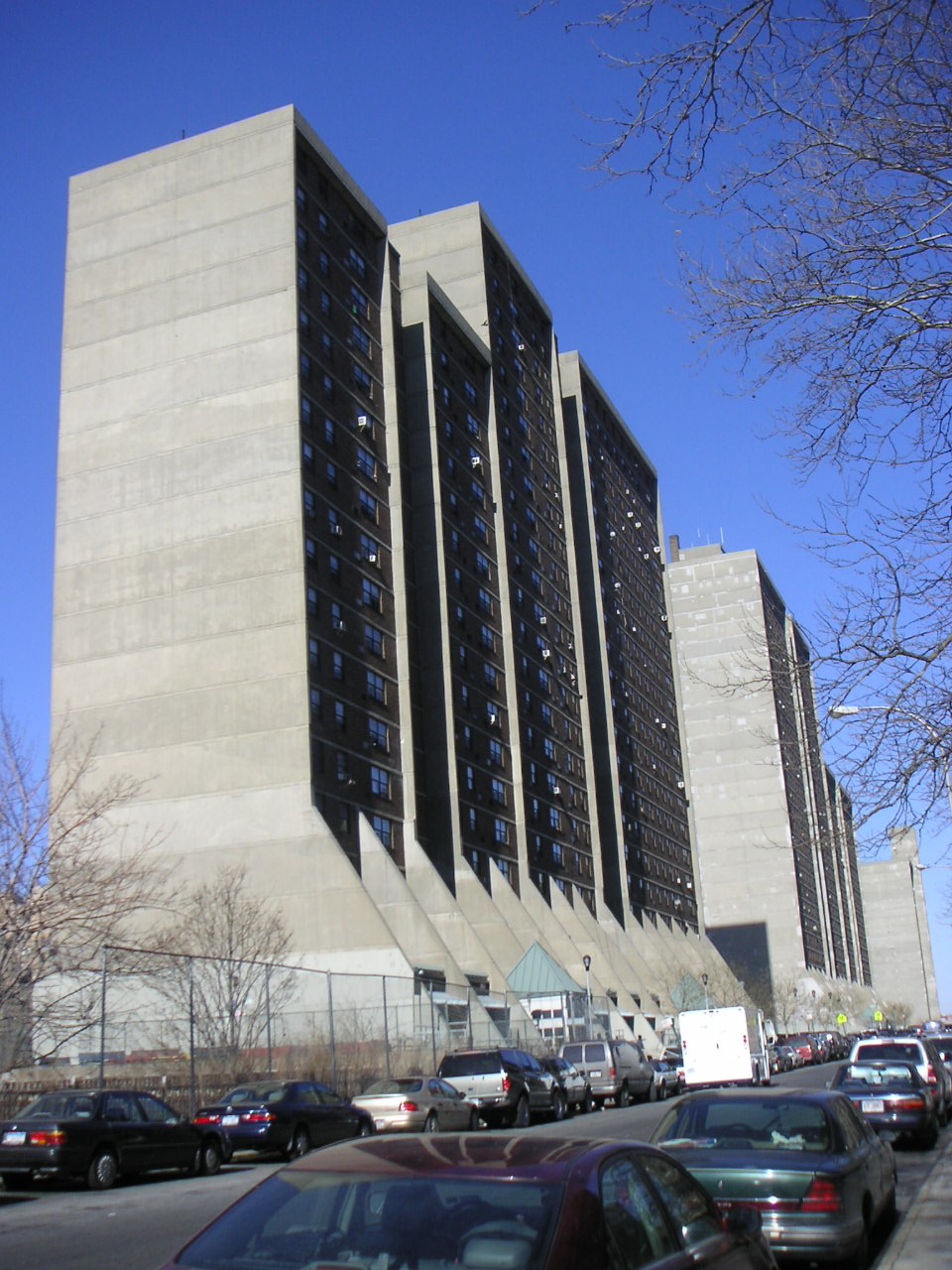
Morrisania Air Rights

Twenty NYCHA developments are located in Morrisania:

- 1162-1176 Washington Avenue; one rehabilitated 6-story tenement building
- Butler Houses; six 21-story buildings
- Claremont Parkway-Franklin Avenue Area; three buildings, 3 and 7 stories tall
- Davidson Houses; one 8-story building
- Eagle Avenue-East 163rd Street; one 6-story building
- Forest Houses; fifteen buildings, 9, 10, and 14 stories tall
- Franklin Avenue I (Conventional); three rehabilitated tenement buildings, 5 stories tall
- Franklin Avenue I M.H.O.P. (Multi-Family Homeownership Program); two rehabilitated tenement buildings, 5 stories tall
- Franklin Avenue II (Conventional); three rehabilitated tenement buildings, 5 stories tall
- Franklin Avenue III (Conventional); one 5-story rehabilitated tenement building
- Franklin Avenue III M.H.O.P. (Multi-Family Homeownership Program); three rehabilitated tenement buildings, 5 stories tall
- Jennings Street M.H.O.P. (Multi-Family Homeownership Program); three rehabilitated tenement buildings, 5 stories tall
- McKinley Houses; five 16-story buildings
- Morris I; ten buildings, 16 and 20 stories tall
- Morris II; seven buildings, 16 and 20 stories tall
- Morrisania Air Rights; two 16-story buildings
- PSS Grandparent; one 6-story building
- Union Avenue-East 163rd Street; one nine-story building
- Union Avenue-East 166th Street; six 3-story buildings
- Webster Houses; five 21-story buildings

== Police and crime ==
Morrisania and Crotona Park East are patrolled by the 42nd Precinct of the NYPD, located at 830 Washington Avenue. The 42nd Precinct ranked 45th safest out of 69 patrol areas for per-capita crime in 2010. As of 2018, with a non-fatal assault rate of 161 per 100,000 people, Morrisania and Crotona Park East's rate of violent crimes per capita is greater than that of the city as a whole. The incarceration rate of 1,243 per 100,000 people is higher than that of the city as a whole.

The 42nd Precinct has a lower crime rate than in the 1990s, with crimes across all categories have decreased by 47.6% between 1990 and 2025. The precinct reported 1 murder, 3 rapes, 4 robberies, 11 felony assaults, 6 burglaries, 11 grand larcenies, and 5 grand larcenies auto in 2025.

== Fire safety ==
Morrisania contains two New York City Fire Department (FDNY) fire stations. Engine Co. 50/Ladder Co. 19/Battalion 26 is located at 1155 Washington Avenue, while Rescue 3 is located at 1655 Washington Avenue.

In addition, FDNY EMS Station 26 is located at 1264 Boston Road.

== Health ==
As of 2018, preterm births and births to teenage mothers are more common in Morrisania and Crotona Park East than in other places citywide. In Morrisania and Crotona Park East, there were 107 preterm births per 1,000 live births (compared to 87 per 1,000 citywide), and 35.6 births to teenage mothers per 1,000 live births (compared to 19.3 per 1,000 citywide). Morrisania and Crotona Park East has a relatively average population of residents who are uninsured. In 2018, this population of uninsured residents was estimated to be 12%, equal to the citywide rate of 12%.

The concentration of fine particulate matter, the deadliest type of air pollutant, in Morrisania and Crotona Park East is 0.0078 milligrams per cubic metre (7.8×10^{−9} oz/ft^{3}), more than the city average. Sixteen percent of Morrisania and Crotona Park East residents are smokers, which is higher than the city average of 14% of residents being smokers. In Morrisania and Crotona Park East, 36% of residents are obese, 22% are diabetic, and 32% have high blood pressure—compared to the citywide averages of 24%, 11%, and 28% respectively. In addition, 20% of children are obese, compared to the citywide average of 20%.

Eighty-one percent of residents eat some fruits and vegetables every day, which is less than the city's average of 87%. In 2018, 69% of residents described their health as "good", "very good", or "excellent", lower than the city's average of 78%. For every supermarket in Morrisania and Crotona Park East, there are 10 bodegas.

The nearest hospitals are NYC Health + Hospitals/Lincoln in Mott Haven and Bronx-Lebanon Hospital Center in Claremont.

== Post offices and ZIP Codes ==
Morrisania is mostly covered by the ZIP Codes 10456, although the southern edge of the neighborhood is part of 10451 and the northernmost several blocks are part of 10457. The United States Postal Service operates two post offices in Morrisania:

- Melcourt Station – 860 Melrose Avenue
- Morrisania Station – 442 East 167th Street
- Hub Station – 633 St. Ann's Avenue

== Education ==
Morrisania and Crotona Park East generally have a lower rate of college-educated residents than the rest of the city as of 2018. While 19% of residents age 25 and older have a college education or higher, 36% have less than a high school education and 45% are high school graduates or have some college education. By contrast, 26% of Bronx residents and 43% of city residents have a college education or higher. The percentage of Morrisania and Crotona Park East students excelling in math rose from 19% in 2000 to 41% in 2011, and reading achievement increased from 28% to 32% during the same time period.

Morrisania and Crotona Park East's rate of elementary school student absenteeism is more than the rest of New York City. In Morrisania and Crotona Park East, 34% of elementary school students missed twenty or more days per school year, higher than the citywide average of 20%. Additionally, 63% of high school students in Morrisania and Crotona Park East graduate on time, lower than the citywide average of 75%.

=== Schools ===
Public schools include:

- PS 2/63: Morrisania (East 169th Street and Franklin Avenue)
- PS/MS 4: Crotona Park West (East 173rd Street and Fulton Avenue)
- PS 42: Claremont Village (Claremont Parkway and Washington Avenue)
- PS 35: Franz Siegel (East 163 Street and Grant Avenue)
- PS 88: Morrisania (Sheridan Ave and Marcy Place)
- PS 90: George Meany (McClellan and Sheridan Avenue)
- PS 53: Basheer Quisim School (East 168th Street)
- PS 55: Benjamin Franklin (St. Paul's Place and Washington Avenue)
- PS 110: Theodore Schoenfield (Crotona Park South and Fulton Avenue)
- PS 132: Garrett A. Morgan (East 168th Street and Washington Avenue)
- PS 140: Eagle (East 163rd Street and Eagle Avenue)
- PS 146: Edward "Pops" Collins (East 164th Street and Cauldwell Avenue)
- PS 186: Walter J. Damrosch Day Treatment Center (Jennings Street and Union Avenue)
- PS 198:(East 168th Street and Tinton Avenue)
- PS/MS 212: Theodore Gathings (Home Street and Union Avenue)
- PS 463-Urban Scholars Community School
- MS 128: Mott Hall III (St. Paul's Place and Washington Avenue) [occupying the 5th & 6th floor of the Benjamin Franklin School]
- MS 145: Arturo Toscanini (East 165th Street and Teller Avenue)
- MS 219: Charles Richard Drew (East 169th Street and Third Avenue)
- MS 301: Paul Laurence Dunbar (East 161st Street and Cauldwell Avenue)
- MS 313/339: Diana Sands (East 172nd Street and Webster Avenue)
- Morris High School (East 166th Street and Boston Road)
- Jane Addams High School (East 161st Street and Tinton Avenue)
- Bronx Center for Science and Mathematics (East 169th Street and Fulton Avenue)
- Eximius College Preparatory Academy (East 169th Street and Fulton Avenue)
- Bathgate High School Campus (Claremont Parkway and Bathgate Avenue)
- Success Academy Bronx 3, a K–2 charter school
- The Eagle Academy for Young Men (East 176th Street and Third Avenue)

=== Libraries ===
The New York Public Library operates the Morrisania branch at 610 East 169th Street. The branch, a Carnegie library, opened in 1908 and was designed by Babb, Cook & Willard. Another branch, the Grand Concourse branch, is located at 155 East 173rd Street. The branch is a two-story structure that opened in 1959.

== Transportation ==
There are no New York City Subway stations in Morrisania, though several bus routes connect with subway stations. The following MTA Regional Bus Operations bus routes serve Morrisania:

- Bx6 and Bx6 SBS: to Hunts Point or Riverside Drive in Washington Heights (via 161st and 163rd Streets)
- Bx11: to Parkchester station (6 and <6> trains) or George Washington Bridge Bus Terminal (via 170th Street, Claremont Parkway, 174th Street)
- Bx15: to Fordham Plaza or The Hub (via Third Avenue)
- Bx21: to Westchester Square–East Tremont Avenue (6 and <6> trains) or Third Avenue–138th Street (6 and <6> trains) (via Boston Road–Morris Park Avenue)
- Bx35: to Crotona Park East or George Washington Bridge Bus Terminal (via 167th Street)
- Bx41 and Bx41 SBS: to Gun Hill Road (2 and 5 trains) or Third Avenue–149th Street (2 and 5 trains) (via Webster Avenue)

The Prospect Avenue (2 and 5 trains), a stop in the neighborhood of Longwood, is within walking distance of Morrisania, as are Intervale Avenue (2 and 5 trains), Simpson Street (2 and 5 trains), Freeman Street (2 and 5 trains), and 174th Street (2 and 5 trains).

Metro-North Railroad's Melrose station, a local station on 162nd Street and the Melrose/Morrisania/Concourse Village border, is served by the Harlem Line, with commuter rail service to Grand Central Terminal and stations in both Westchester County and Putnam County.

== Notable people ==
Notable current and former residents of Morrisania include:

- Iran Barkley (born 1960), former professional boxer who competed from 1982 to 1999
- Ray Barretto (1929–2006), percussionist and bandleader of Puerto Rican ancestry
- Eric Burroughs (1911–1992), stage and radio actor
- Big Pun (1971–2000), rapper, was raised on 163rd and Rogers Place, a mural stands in his honor on the street
- Boogie Down Productions, rap group, KRS-1 was discovered at homeless shelter at the Morrisania Armory on 166th Street and Franklin Avenue by Scott LaRock who was a social worker there
- Geoffrey Canada (born 1952), educator, social activist, and author, founder and president of the Harlem Children’s Zone, grew up on Union Avenue
- Coko (born 1970), lead singer of R&B group SWV, raised in Forest Houses
- Chick Corea (1941–2021), jazz composer, keyboardist, bandleader, and occasional percussionist
- Diamond D, rapper and boom bap producer from Forest Houses, founding member of Diggin' in the Crates Crew
- Gloria Davis (born 1938), politician who served in the New York State Assembly
- Estella B. Diggs (1916–2013), a politician who served in the New York State Assembly
- Fat Joe (born 1970), a rapper from Forest Houses
- Grandmaster Flash, hip-hop DJ considered to be one of the pioneers of scratching, cutting, and mixing and the leader of Grandmaster Flash & The Furious Five inductees into the Rock and Roll Hall of Fame, grew up Fox Street right off 163rd
- Lord Finesse, a rapper from Forest Houses
- Vincent Harding (1931–2014), pastor and historian, best known for his works on Martin Luther King Jr.
- Elmo Hope, jazz pianist, composer, and arranger best known for his work in the bebop and hard bop genres, grew up on Lyman Place
- Jerry Jemmott (born 1946), Grammy Award-winning musician/composer
- Keef Cowboy, dancer and hypeman known as a pioneer in the "call and response" style credited with coining the term "hip-hop", from Prospect Avenue
- Edward Stanley Kellogg (1870–1948), 16th Governor of American Samoa.
- Cuban Link, rapper was raised on Prospect Avenue
- Orlando Marin, Latin jazz and mambo bandleader and timbales player
- Melle Mel, rapper and lead vocalist of Grandmaster Flash & The Furious Five
- Jimmy Merchant (born 1940), doo-wop first tenor member of The Teenagers
- Lewis Morris (1726–1798), chief justice of New York and British governor of New Jersey, was the first lord of the manor of Morrisania in New York City, signed the Declaration of Independence
- Gouverneur Morris (1752–1816), statesman who wrote the Preamble to the United States Constitution
- The Kidd Creole, member of Grandmaster Flash & The Furious Five and brother of Melle Mel
- The Wrens, a doo-wop group were raised in Morrisania and attended Morris High School where they formed the group
- Pucho & His Latin Soul Brothers, Latin jazz, soul, and R&B group
- The Chords, doo-wop group
- The Chantels, pop, doo-wop, and rock and roll group
- Lillian Leach, doo-wop singer and lead vocalist of the group The Mellows
- Thelonious Monk, jazz pianist and composer, lived on Lyman Place for some years
- Charlie Palmieri, renowned bandleader and musical director of salsa music
- Eddie Palmieri, Grammy Award-winning pianist, bandleader, musician, and composer
- Colin Powell (1937–2021), politician, diplomat, and retired four-star general who served as the 65th United States Secretary of State from 2001 to 2005. Powell was the first African-American Secretary of State., grew up on Kelly Street and attended Morris High School
- Desi Rodriguez, basketball player, grew up on Washington Avenue
- Tito Rodriguez, mambo, chacha, bolero, pachanga, cha cha cha, and guaracha bandleader and singer, lived on Rogers Place
- Mongo Santamaria, Afro-Cuban percussionist and bandleader
- Romeo Santos, singer, songwriter, actor, record producer, and the lead vocalist of the bachata band Aventura, grew up near Boston Road and attended Morris High School
- Showbiz, rapper and producer from Forest Houses and one half of duo Showbiz & AG
- Maxine Sullivan (1911–1987), jazz vocalist and performer, lived on Ritter Place
- Helen Rand Thayer (1863–1935), suffragist and social reformer
- Frederick Trump (1869–1918), grandfather of president of the United States Donald Trump lived at 1006 Westchester Avenue in the then German-speaking Morrisania
- Elsie B. Washington (1942–2009), novelist
- Xtreme, bachata duo, grew up on East 169th Street
