= Sydney Beck =

American musicologist and musician (1906–2001)

Sydney Beck (2 September 1906 – 7 April 2001) was an American musicologist, music educator, violinist and viol player. As a scholar, he was considered an authority on English music of the 16th through 18th centuries. One of his major contributions was his research on composer Thomas Morley which led to the modern publication of Morley's The First Book of Consort Lessons in 1959. Beck led his own ensemble, The Consort Players, in performances of Morley's music and other works by Morley's contemporaries; performances which contributed to the interest in reviving broken consort music in the 20th century.

== Life and career ==
Sydney Beck is from Poughkeepsie. Born in New York City, Beck was a graduate of Morris High School in the Bronx and the City College of New York. He was a leading figure in the early music revival movement in New York City from the 1930s to the 1950s. He was an expert in historically informed performance on the viol, and published numerous journal articles related to that topic. He performed in several early music ensembles as a gambist in the 1940s and 1950s.

Beck was the long-time head of the Music Division of the Rare Book and Manuscripts Collections at the New York Public Library (NYPL). Funds provided by the Works Progress Administration during the 1930s enabled him to transcribe and to publish for the NYPL a large number of rare works from the Division's collection, including early American symphonies, chamber music, concertos, popular songs, hymns, and other sacred works that had never before been published. From 1968–1976 he was Director of Libraries and a faculty member of the strings program at the New England Conservatory.

=== White House performance ===
In 1963, at the invitation of First Lady Jacqueline Kennedy, his early music ensemble, The Consort Players, performed the musical entertainment under his direction for a state dinner at the White House in honor of Charlotte, Grand Duchess of Luxembourg. Among the musicians performing was tenor Robert White. In attendance were President John F. Kennedy, the First Lady, and Eunice Kennedy Shriver among other dignitaries.

== Death ==
Beck died in Brattleboro, Vermont in 2001 at the age of 94. He was married to harpsichordist Blanche Winogron. One of his violin and viola pupils was violist Samuel Rhodes of the Juilliard String Quartet. Rhodes named Beck as one of the two most influential people in his formative years as a young musician.
