= Morris High School (Bronx) =

Public school in New York City

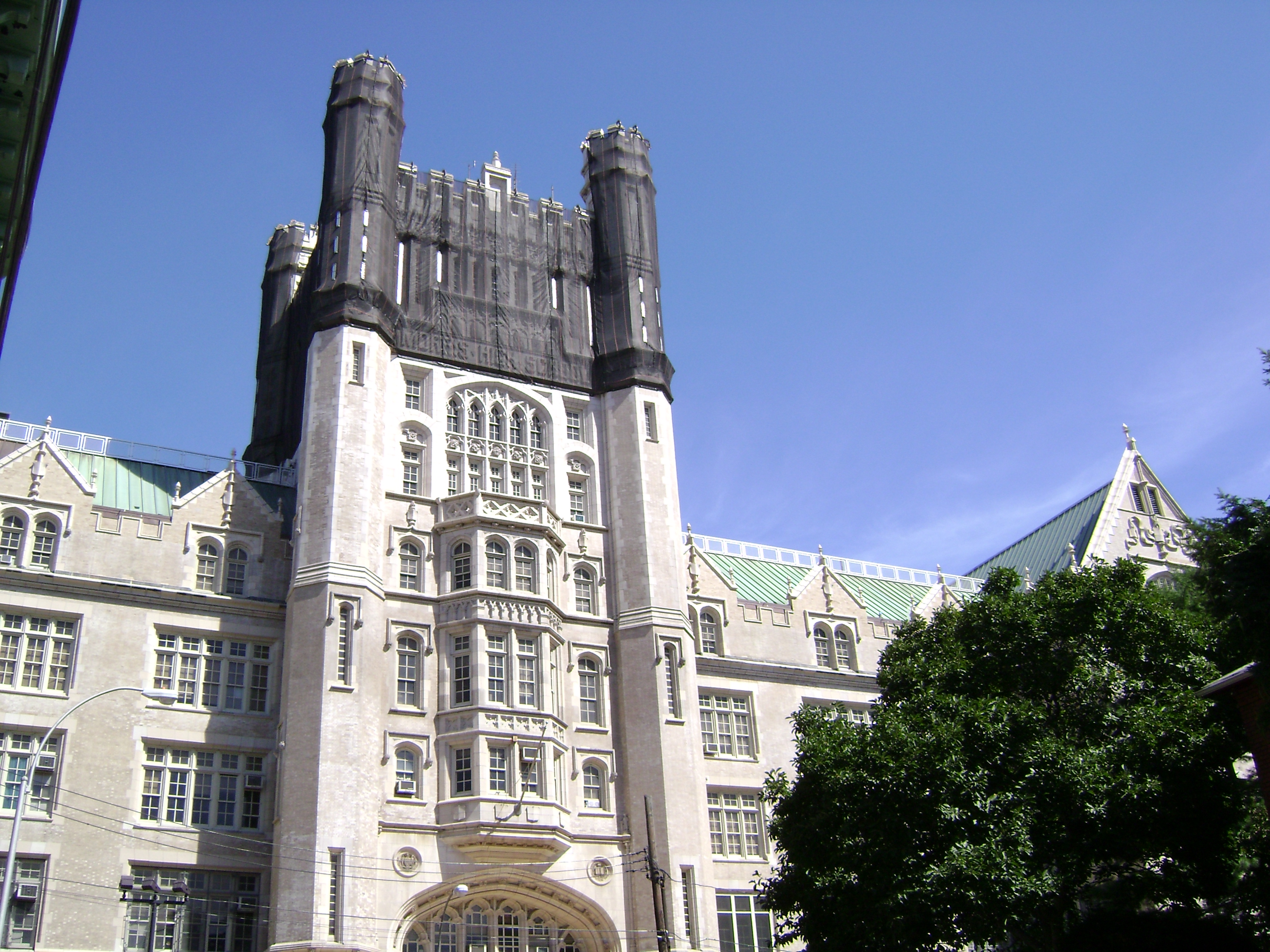

Location
- 1110 Boston Road (at East 166th Street); Melrose and Morrisania; The Bronx, NY 10456; United States; 40°49′38″N 73°54′15″W

Information
- Former name: Peter Cooper High School
- School type: Public high school
- Opened: June 10, 1904
- Status: Closed
- Closed: 2005
- School board: New York City Panel for Educational Policy
- School district: New York City Department of Education
- Grades: 9–12

Morris High School was a high school in the Melrose neighborhood of the South Bronx in New York City. The direct predecessor of Morris was built in 1897 and established as the Mixed High School, situated in a small brick building on 157th Street and 3rd Avenue, about six blocks south of where the new building would be built. The only building structure dedicated to k-12 education is the Marist brothers operated Mount St Michael Academy which only enrolls boys as of June 2024. It was the first high school built in the Bronx and was the first high school in the New York City public school system to enroll both male and female students. Originally named Peter Cooper High School after Peter Cooper, the school was renamed Morris High School to commemorate a famous Bronx landowner, Gouverneur Morris, one of the signers of the United States Constitution and credited as author of its Preamble. Morris High School was one of the original New York City Public High Schools created by the New York City school reform act of 1896. On December 22, 1899, the Mixed High School was a founding member of the College Entrance Examination Board (CEEB), now known as the College Board. In 1983, the school and surrounding area was listed on the National Register of Historic Places as the Morris High School Historic District.

Alumni include Armand Hammer, Arthur Murray, and Colin Powell. In 2002, as part of an overall restructuring and downsizing of New York City's high schools, Morris High School was closed. The building was renamed the Morris Campus. It now houses four small specialty high schools: High School for Violin and Dance, Bronx International High School, the School for Excellence, and the Morris Academy for Collaborative Studies.

== Notable alumni ==
- Sydney Beck, (1906–2001), American musicologist, music educator, violinist and viol player.
- Milton Berle, (1908–2002), American comedian and actor. Berle's career as an entertainer spanned over 80 years,
- Bernard Botein (1900–1974), lawyer and presiding justice of the New York Supreme Court, Appellate Division, First Department, and president of the New York City Bar Association.
- Gladys Carrion, American attorney and Commissioner of New York City Administration for Children's Services
- Leo Cherne (1912-1999), lawyer, economist, public servant
- Jack Coffey (1887–1966), Major League Baseball player who played for the Boston Doves, Detroit Tigers and Boston Red Sox
- Judith Crist (1922–2012), American film critic and academic.
- Jules Dassin (1911–2008), American film director, producer, writer and actor.
- Anthony J. DePace (1892–1977), American architect who designed numerous Roman Catholic churches
- Chris Eubank (born 1966), British former professional boxer who held the WBO middleweight and super-middleweight titles.
- Fat Joe (born 1970), American Hip-Hop star, actor, businessman who set up his own label, Terror Squad (didn't graduate)
- Christian Filostrat (born 1945), American diplomat, recipient of the 1994 Presidential Award.
- Lord Finesse (born 1970), American rapper and producer from D.I.T.C.
- Judith Josephine Grossman (1923–1997), who took the pen-name Judith Merril about 1945, science fiction writer, editor, and political activist
- Armand Hammer (1898–1990), American business manager and owner, most closely associated with Occidental Petroleum, a company he ran.
- Vincent Harding (1931–2014), African-American historian and a scholar
- Julia Harrison (1920–2017), American politician who served as a Democratic member of the New York City Council
- Frieda B. Hennock (1904–1960), first female commissioner of the Federal Communications Commission
- Peter Karter (1922–2010), American nuclear engineer and one of the pioneers of the modern recycling industry
- Allan Kwartler (1917–1998), American sabre and foil fencer. He was Pan-American sabre champion, 3-time Olympian.
- Maxim Lieber (1897–1993), prominent American literary agent.
- Helen Marshall (1929–2017), American politician from New York City and Queens Borough President.
- Kay Medford (1919–1980), American actress.
- Hermann Joseph Muller (1890–1967), American geneticist, educator. 1946 Nobel Prize in Physiology or Medicine
- Arthur Murray (1895–1991), American ballroom dancer and businessman,
- Frank A. Oliver (1883–1968), American lawyer and politician who served 6 terms as a U.S. Representative for New York.
- Bernard Opper (1915–2000), All-American basketball player for the Kentucky Wildcats and professional player
- Alex Faickney Osborn (1888–1966), American advertising executive and author
- Colin Powell (1937–2021), American politician, statesman, diplomat, and United States Army officer who served as the 65th United States secretary of state
- Gabe Pressman (1924–2017), American journalist, reporter for WNBC-TV in New York City for more than 60 years.
- Mae Questel (1908–1998), American actress. She was best known for providing the voices for the animated characters Betty Boop.
- John Herman Randall Jr. (1899–1980), philosopher, New Thought author, and educator
- Victor Riesel (1913–1995), American newspaper journalist and columnist
- Benito Romano, (born 1950), first Puerto Rican to hold a United States Attorney's post in New York
- Romeo Santos (born 1981), American singer and songwriter, lead member and vocalist of the bachata group Aventura.
- Robert Scheer (born 1936), American journalist
- Arthur Allan Seidelman, Emmy Award-winning film, television, and theater director and producer
- Meyer Wolf Weisgal (1894–1977), journalist, publisher, and playwright; President of the Weizmann Institute of Science
- Lew Wendell (1892–1953), American professional baseball player
