= Broken consort =

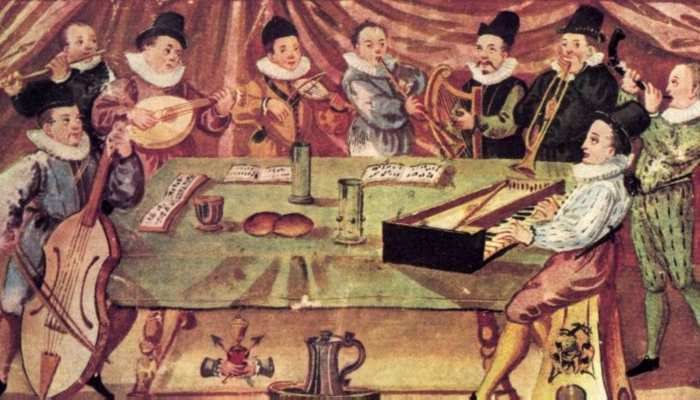
A Music College, from "Gymnasium illustre", Lauingen, Germany, c. 1590

In English early Baroque music, a broken consort is an ensemble featuring instruments from more than one family, for example a group featuring both string and wind instruments. A consort consisting entirely of instruments of the same family, on the other hand, was referred to as a "whole consort", though this expression is not found until well into the seventeenth century. The word "consort", used in this way, is an earlier form of "concert", according to one opinion, while other sources hold the reverse: that it comes from the French term concert or its Italian parent term concerto, in its sixteenth-century sense. Matthew Locke published pieces for whole and broken consorts of two to six parts as late as 1672.

== History of the term ==
Though historically the term only came into use in the late seventeenth century and with reference only to English music, some more recent writers have applied the term retrospectively to music of earlier periods and of different nationalities, and—through a confounding of the terms "broken music" with "broken consort"—more specifically to a six-part instrumentation popular in England from the late-sixteenth and early seventeenth centuries, contemporaneously referred to as an "English consort".

In late sixteenth-century England the word "consort" on its own was normally applied to groups of diverse instruments coming from different families, and the sense of the term "broken" in the Elizabethan era refers primarily to division, the "breaking" of long notes into shorter ones. "It is the shimmering effect of this 'sweet broken music' that so delighted audiences then and continues to cast its spell today."

== The English consort ==
As constituted during the time of Queen Elizabeth I (called an "Englisch consort" by Praetorius in 1618, and more recently a "mixed consort" or "consort-of-six", or a "Morley consort",), it typically featured three plucked string instruments (lute, cittern, and bandora, called "Pandora" by Morley), two bowed instruments (treble viol or violin, and bass viol), and a recorder or transverse flute. Such consorts became quite popular during the Elizabethan era and often accompanied vocal songs.

Two manuscript sets of partbooks dating from 1588 and ca. 1590 are the earliest substantial sources of music for this consort. The earlier collection is known as the Walsingham Consort Books, and contains 34 pieces, including twelve by Richard Allison and seven by Daniel Bachiler, who likely wrote and owned these books. The later set of partbooks was copied by Matthew Holmes, and is known both as the Holmes Consort Books and as the Cambridge Consort Books, because they are deposited in the Cambridge University Library. There are also individual parts from consorts found in various other manuscripts, most notably the "Browne bandora book", which contains the bandora parts to 35 consort pieces. There are also twenty-five surviving compositions for this type of consort by several composers in a collection published by Thomas Morley (1599/1611). There were a number of other consort compositions published by Philip Rosseter (1609), and some vocal music accompanied by this specific consort was published in collections such as William Leighton's The Teares and Lamentatacions of a Sorrowfull Soule (1614) and the Psalms of David in Metre (1599) by Richard Allison.

Sydney Beck made the first modern edition of Morley's collection and had a professional consort in New York state. Julian Bream was a pioneer in reviving the consort. James Tyler did much to popularise the playing of these consorts by getting music students at the University of Southern California to play all six instruments. The Baltimore Consort, an American ensemble, specializes in the performance of music for broken consort.

== See also ==
- Consort of instruments
- Music in the Elizabethan era
