= Blanche Winogron =

American musician (1911–2002)

Blanche Winogron (May 8, 1911 – November 22, 2002) was an American harpsichordist, pianist, virginalist, and teacher.

She taught at the Mannes College of Music from 1961 to 1969, and the New England Conservatory of Music from 1968 to 1977. Her students included Peter Sykes and Wendy Redlinger. She was a member of New York Pro Musica and the Rococo Ensemble, and a founding member of the Consort of Players.

She was married to American music scholar and librarian Sydney Beck; they had a son, Michael Beck.

== Discography ==
- Farnaby: Canzonets and Virginals Music. EMS 5 (1953)
- Adriano Banchieri: Festino. Esoteric ES-516 (1953)
- An Elizabethan Songbag for Young People. Esoteric ESJ-6 (1954)
- Children's Songs of Shakespeare's Time. Counterpoint / Esoteric CPT 540 (1957)
- Thomas Morley: Elizabethan Madrigals, Canzonets and Ballets. Counterpoint CPT-520 (1966)
- Fitzwilliam Virginal Book (selections). Dover HCR-ST-7015 (stereo) (1966)
