= Morris High School Historic District =

Historic district in the Bronx, New York

- U.S. National Register of Historic Places
- U.S. Historic district
- New York City Landmark
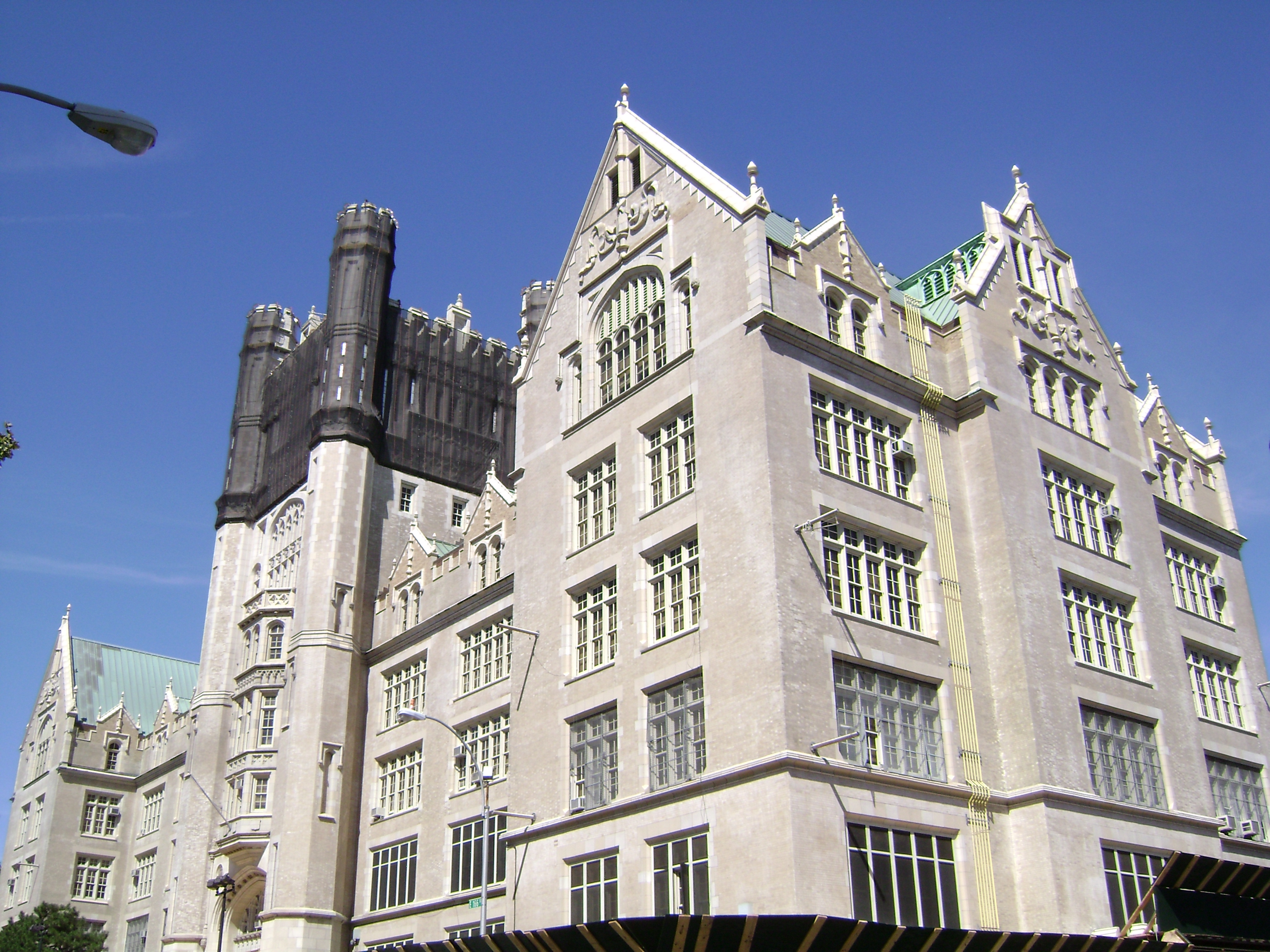

- Location within New York City Location within New York Location within the United States
- Location: Roughly bounded by Boston Rd., Jackson and Forest Aves., and E. 166th and Home Sts., New York, New York
- Coordinates: 40°49′38″N 73°54′15″W
- Area: 8 acres (3.2 ha)
- Built: 1874
- Architect: Multiple
- Architectural style: Classical Revival, Gothic, Free Classic
- NRHP reference No.: 83001641
- NYCL No.: 1258

Significant dates
- Added to NRHP: September 15, 1983
- Designated NYCL: December 21, 1982

The Morris High School Historic District is a city and national historic district centered on Morris High School in Morrisania, Bronx, New York City. The district includes 51 contributing buildings on three city blocks. It includes the Morris High School, two streets of brick rowhouses, and Trinity Episcopal Church of Morrisania. The high school and rowhouses were built between 1897 and 1904. The church complex started in 1874. Morris High School, and by extension the Historic District, sits upon one of the highest points in the Bronx. Hugo Auden, Warren C. Dickerson, Harry T. Howell, and John H. Lavelle designed many of the buildings. The district was listed on the National Register of Historic Places in 1983 and designated by the New York City Landmarks Preservation Commission in 1982.

== Buildings and architecture ==
=== Morris High School ===
Completed and opened in 1904, Morris High School was designed by architect Charles B. J. Snyder during his tenure as New York City's Superintendent of School Buildings and is styled similarly to Curtis High School, Flushing High School, and Erasmus Hall High School. Morris High School, running along East 166th Street, has a large massing and an E-shaped floor plan with light courts. The square central tower measures roughly 189 feet in height and features intricately-carved limestone trim, arches, spires, and shield and scroll motifs that are mimicked and repeated throughout the remainder of the building. Unique to the central tower specifically are carved clover inserts and limestone bay windows. With the exception of the central tower, the roof of the building is almost entirely copper.

A modern cafeteria and gymnasium attachment was added in 1955. It runs parallel to Duncan Hall, an expansive, 800-seat auditorium with buttresses, a built-in organ, detailed mural by painter Auguste F.M. Gorguet, wood floors and stage, and interior expressive buttresses and Tudor arches. The auditorium is designated an interior landmark.

=== Forest Avenue rowhouses ===
Designed primarily by architect Warren C. Dickerson with a complimentary row of five buildings designed by Harry T. Howell, the Forest Avenue townhouses retain a high degree of cohesion with architectural flourishes such as marbled columns, highly-detailed wrought iron, mirrored construction, and bay windows. They are constructed of brick with limestone trim. Detailed cornices of galvanized metal run along the top of each building, and a select few rowhouses possess galvanized metal bays containing similar motifs.

Though each building possessed a similar floorplan upon initial construction, the original interior features are poorly recorded; however, each building was intended to house two families, likely at the behest of speculative landlords. The first two floors were intended to house a single family and contained a secondary staircase separate from the main, ornately-carved stairwell. Each floor possessed a front and rear parlor, along with bedrooms of varying sizes. In at least some of these buildings, the front parlors could be accessed both from hinged or sliding doors directly off of the main stair and from within each floor via sliding double doors. The third floors were laid out similarly, and were intended to house a separate family. The basements of these buildings were originally unfinished and used for storage, though some have since been converted into apartments.

As one of the last sets of original rowhouses built before the sharp decline in rowhouse construction, the Forest Avenue rowhouses possessed very similar interior fixtures to their Manhattan and Brooklyn counterparts, such as complex plaster ceiling medallions, plaster and wooden crown moldings and trim, hardwood flooring, decorated fireplaces, high ceilings, and wood paneling. Surviving examples of similarly-ornate rowhouses in the Bronx are believed to be rare.

The Forest Avenue and Jackson Avenue rowhouses were initially bordered by a tenement building and storefront on the corner of Forest Avenue and Home Street. It was demolished shortly before the district was landmarked, becoming the Jackson Forest (later Marie Brooks) Community Garden. 735 East 166th Street, on the other end of Forest Avenue, is a five-story Renaissance Revival rowhouse.

=== Jackson Avenue rowhouses ===
The Jackson Avenue rowhouses possess much more architectural variance than the Forest Avenue rowhouses, designed primarily by Dickerson; the rest were designed by John H. Lavelle. Much of Dickerson's design-work on the corner of Jackson and 166th Street, which includes a rounded tenement building intended to align with the first set of rowhouses, is similar to his work on Forest Avenue, albeit in a smaller package. Lavelle's designs contain more ornate frontage with carved limestone frames and lintels, eventually adding rounded roof turrets further into the avenue that reflect Dickerson's earlier, gabled and false-roofed buildings on this street. Similar to the Forest Avenue buildings, the Jackson Avenue rowhouses possessed ornate wrought iron railings and window bars. Some Jackson Avenue buildings also possess stained glass entryways. These two-story buildings were also intended as two-family homes.

=== Trinity Episcopal Church ===
Beginning construction in 1874, the Trinity Episcopal Church (designed by an unknown architect) is the oldest building in the district. Constructed with red brick in a High Victorian Gothic style, it has similar facade details to Morris High School. The rear of the building was expanded in 1905 with the addition of Smith Memorial Hall. Despite sharing its elevated plot, the church's rectory is not officially part of the Historic District.

== See also ==
- List of New York City Designated Landmarks in the Bronx
- National Register of Historic Places listings in the Bronx
