= Butler Houses =

Public housing development in the Bronx, New York

- NYCHA Property
- Interactive map of Butler Houses
- Country: United States
- state: New York
- City: New York City
- Borough: Bronx

Area
  - Total: 12.78 acres (5.17 ha)

Population
  - Total: 3,696
- Zip Code: 10456

The Butler Houses is a NYCHA housing project with 6 buildings each having 21 stories. It is located between East 169th to 171st Streets and also between Park and Webster Avenues in Morrisania, the Bronx. The complex is named after Edmond Borgia Butler (1896–1956), who served as the chairperson of NYCHA from 1942 to 1947.

== History ==
The project was approved by the New York City Planning Commission in October 1957 and began construction in April 1961. This housing project was completed in December 1964. It is part of four contiguous public housing projects—which also include the Morris, Morrisania and Webster houses—that are collectively named Claremont Village.

The housing complex was designed by the architectural firm of Joseph & Vladeck. An early concept for the project included five buildings, four of which had a skip floor plan with exterior galleries in lieu of internal corridors. The combination of these plans had never been used before and was copyrighted by the architects, who also applied for a patent for their design. This design was estimated to reduce the cost of the project by $17 million.

=== 21st century ===
This housing complex along with the Mitchel Houses got newer technology such as upgraded elevators in 2025, which is part of over 125 other elevator replacement projects using $1.2 billion in funding provided by the state since 2019.

== See also ==
- New York City Housing Authority
