= Webster Houses =

Public housing development in the Bronx, New York

- NYCHA Property
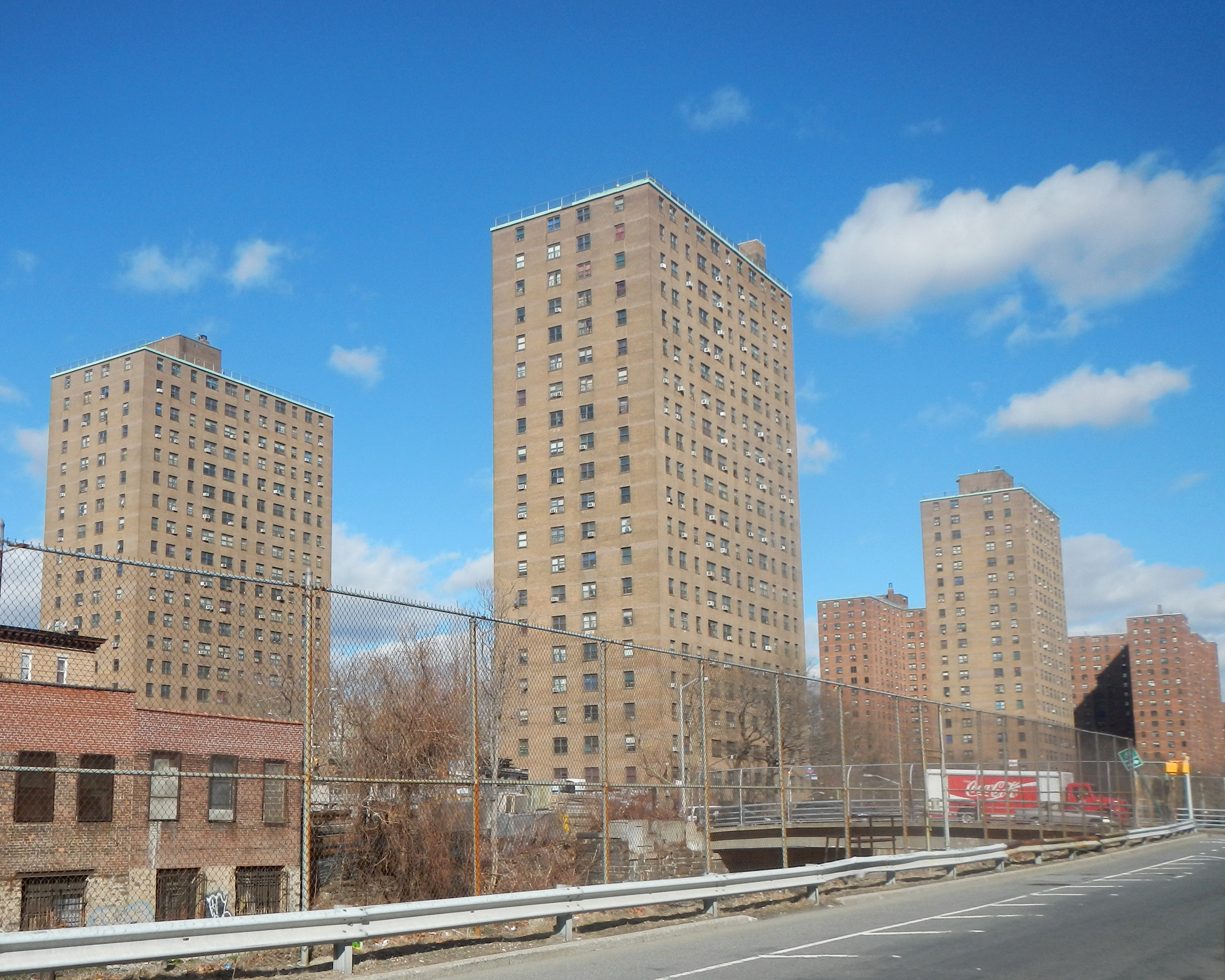
- Interactive map of Webster Houses
- Country: United States
- State: New York
- City: New York City
- Borough: Bronx

Area
  - Total: 4.43 acres (1.79 ha)

Population
  - Total: 1,423
- Zip Code: 10456

The Webster Houses is a NYCHA housing project that has 5 buildings each with 21 stories individually. It is located between Webster and Park Avenues and also between East 168th and 169th Streets in Morrisania, The Bronx. It is also located directly adjacent to the Metro-North Railroad train tracks. It was named after Daniel Webster (1782–1852) and the avenue abutting the complex.

== History ==
This housing project was completed in September 1965. Named after Daniel Webster and Webster Avenue, the complex was designed by architect Seymour R. Joseph. It is part of four contiguous public housing projects—which also include the Butler, Morris and Morrisania houses—that are collectively named Claremont Village.

== See also ==
- New York City Housing Authority
