= Orpharion =

Plucked stringed instrument from the Renaissance

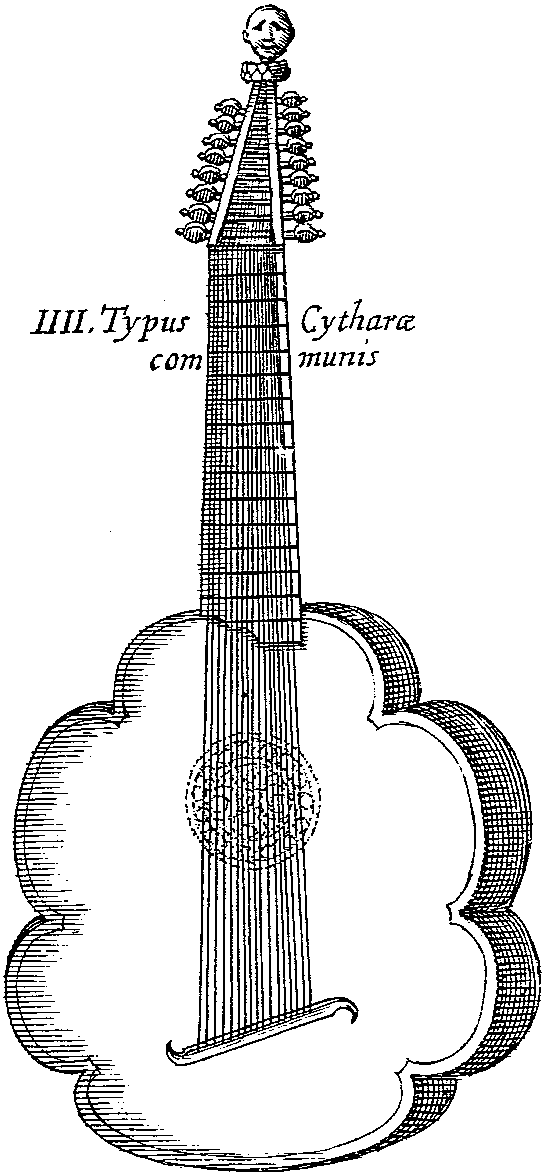
- An orpharion, labeled cythara communis, from Kircher's Musurgia Universalis
- Classification: String instrument (plucked)
- Hornbostel–Sachs classification: 321.322 (Composite chordophone)
- Developed: 15th century

Related instruments
- List: Lute; Mandolin

The orpharion (/ˌɔːrfəˈraɪən/ or /ɔːrˈfæriən/) or opherion /ɒˈfɪəriən/ is a plucked stringed instrument from the Renaissance, a member of the cittern family. Its construction is similar to the larger bandora and is an ancestor of the guitar. The metal strings are tuned like a lute and are plucked with the fingers. It has a multi-scale fingerboard: the nut and bridge of an orpharion are typically sloped, so that the string length increases from treble to bass. Due to the extremely low-tension metal strings, which would easily distort the notes when pushed down, the frets were almost flush with the fingerboard, which was gently scalloped. As with all metal-strung instruments of the era, a very light touch with the plucking hand was required, quite different from the sharper attack used on the lute.

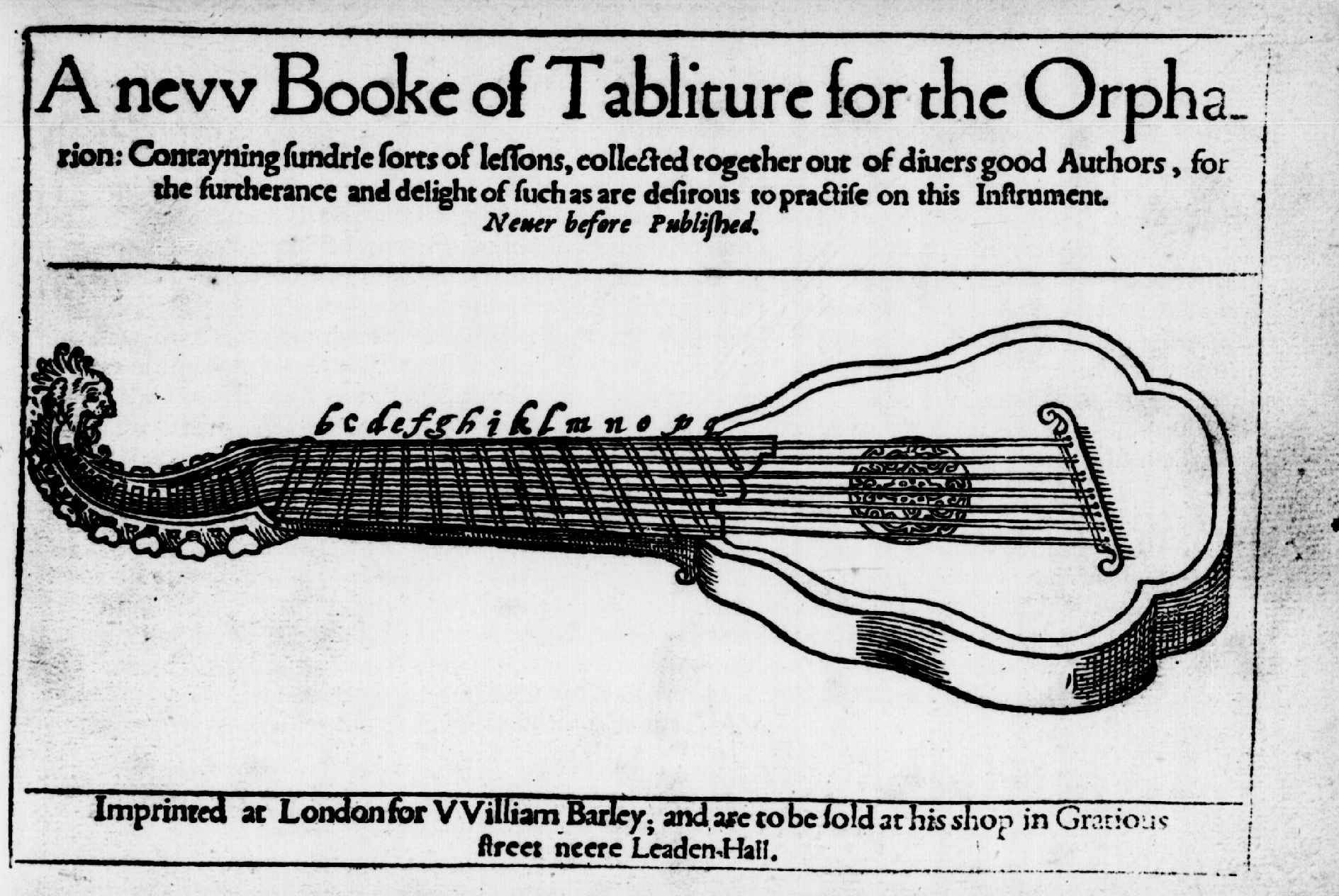
Picture of an Orpharion by John Rose used in the frontispiece for William Barley's Book of Tablature 1596

The orpharion was invented in England in the second half of the 16th century; in sources of English music it is often mentioned as an alternative to the lute. According to Stow's "Annals" (1631), John Rose of Bridewell invented the instrument in 1581. A Rose orpharion in Helmingham Hall was allegedly given as a gift to Queen Elizabeth I, and may well be that first example. It has six courses and the bridge and nut are parallel. The only other surviving orpharion, now in the Claudius Collection in Copenhagen, has nine courses with fanned frets, and dates to 1617.

The name orpharion comes from Orpheus and Arion.

William Barley published a book of Orpharian tablature in 1596. It contained music by Francis Cutting, John Dowland, Philip Rosseter, Peter Philips, Anthony Holborne, Edward Johnson and William Byrd. It was entitled A new book of tablature for the orpharion, containing sundry sorts of lessons, collected together [by William Barley] out of diverse good authors, for the furtherance and delight of such as are desirous to practise on this instrument.

== Bibliography ==
- Wells, Robin Headlam (1946). Elizabethan Mythologies: Studies in Poetry, Drama, and Music.
