= Bronx Community Board 3 =

Bronx Community District 3 Bronx Community Board 3
- Community District
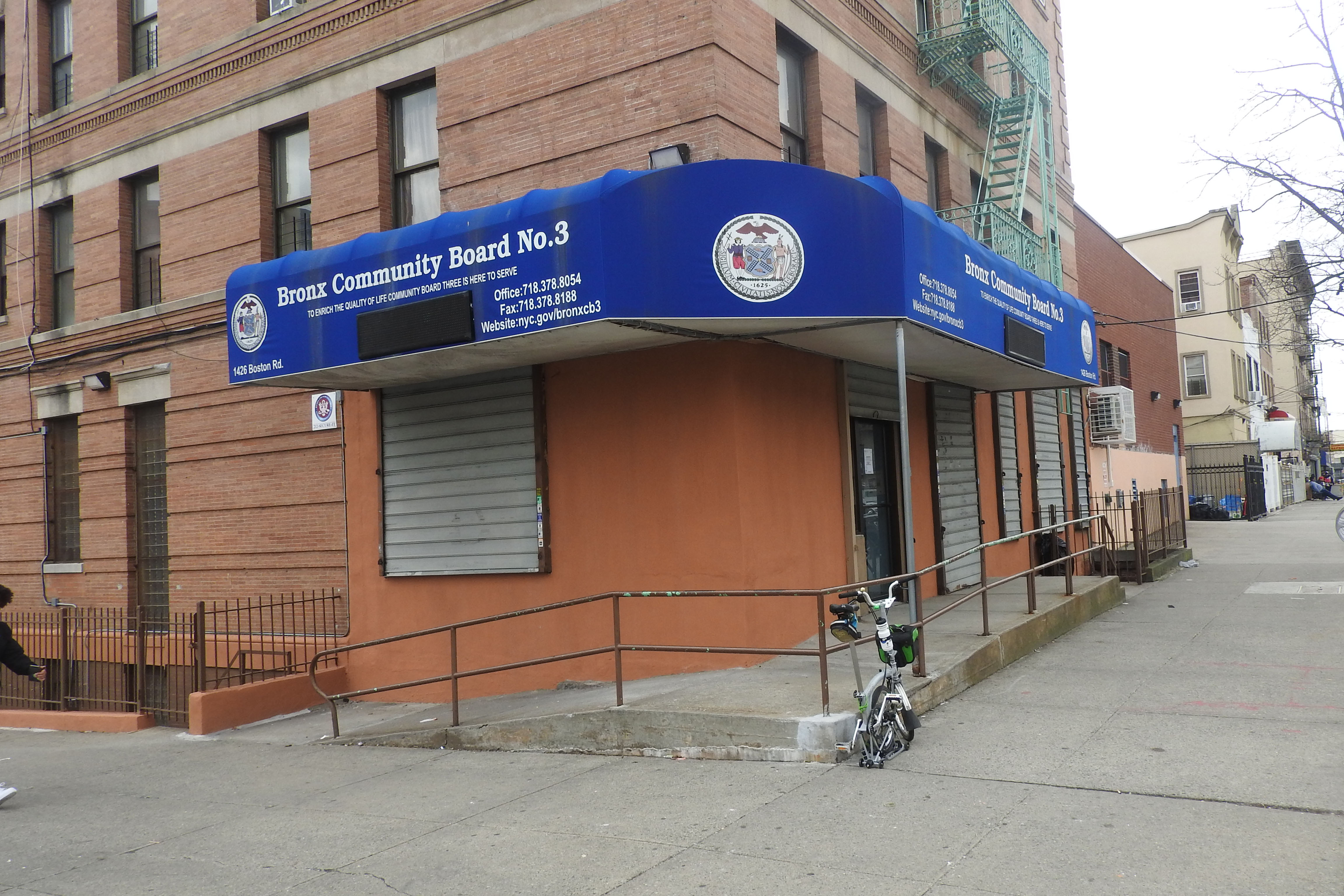
- Office on Boston Road

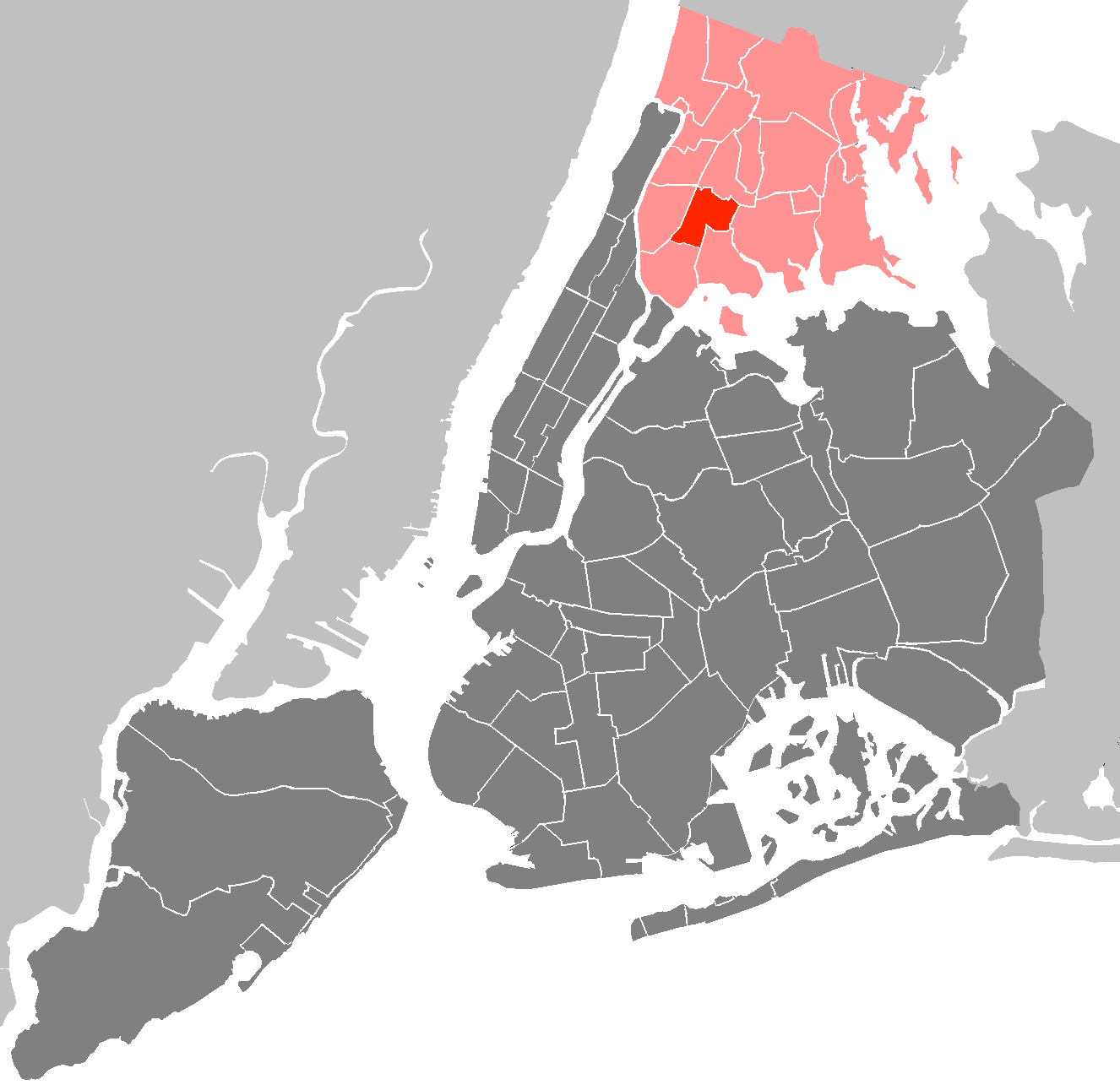
- Location in The Bronx
- Country: United States
- State: New York
- City: New York City
- Borough: The Bronx
- Neighborhoods: list: East Morrisania/Crotona Park East; Melrose; Morrisania

Government
  - Type: Community board
  - Body: Bronx Community Board 3
  - Chairperson: Bruce Rivera
  - District Manager: John Dudley

Area
  - Total: 1.6 sq mi (4.1 km^{2})

Population (2010)
  - Total: 79,762
  - Density: 50,000/sq mi (19,000/km^{2})

Ethnicity
  - Hispanic and Latino Americans: 52.9%
  - African-American: 44.0%
  - White: 1.0%
  - Asian: 0.4%
  - Others: 0.2%
- Time zone: UTC−5 (Eastern)
  - Summer (DST): UTC−4 (EDT)
- ZIP codes: 10456, 10459, and 10460
- Area codes: 718, 347, and 929, and 917
- Police Precincts: 42nd (website)
- Website: www1.nyc.gov/site/bronxcb3/index.page

Bronx Community Board 3 is a local government unit in the New York City borough, of the Bronx, encompassing the neighborhoods of Crotona Park East, Claremont, Concourse Village, Melrose, and Morrisania. It is delimited by Sheridan Boulevard to the east, the Cross Bronx Expressway and Crotona Park North to the north, Park Avenue and Webster Avenue to the west, and East 159th Street and East 161st Street to the south.

== Community board staff and membership ==
The current chairperson of the Bronx Community board 3 is Joetta Brown. Its District Manager is John Dudley. Currently, Dudley is the longest serving District Manager in the borough of the Bronx.

The City Council members representing the community district are non-voting, ex officio board members. The council members and their council districts are:

- 15th NYC Council District - Ritchie Torres
- 16th NYC Council District - Vanessa Gibson
- 17th NYC Council District - Rafael Salamanca

== Demographics ==
As of the United States 2000 Census, the Community Board has a population of 68,574, up from 57,162 in the 1990 Census and 53,638 in 1980. Of them, 36,273 (52.9%) are of Hispanic origin, 30,201 (44%) are Black, non-Hispanic, 678 (1%) are White, non-Hispanic, 248 (0.4%) are Asian or Pacific Islander, 216 (0.3%) American Indian or Alaska Native, 169 (0.2%) are some other race (non-Hispanic), and 789 (1.2%) of two or more races (non-Hispanic).
