= Bandora (instrument) =

Plucked string-instrument

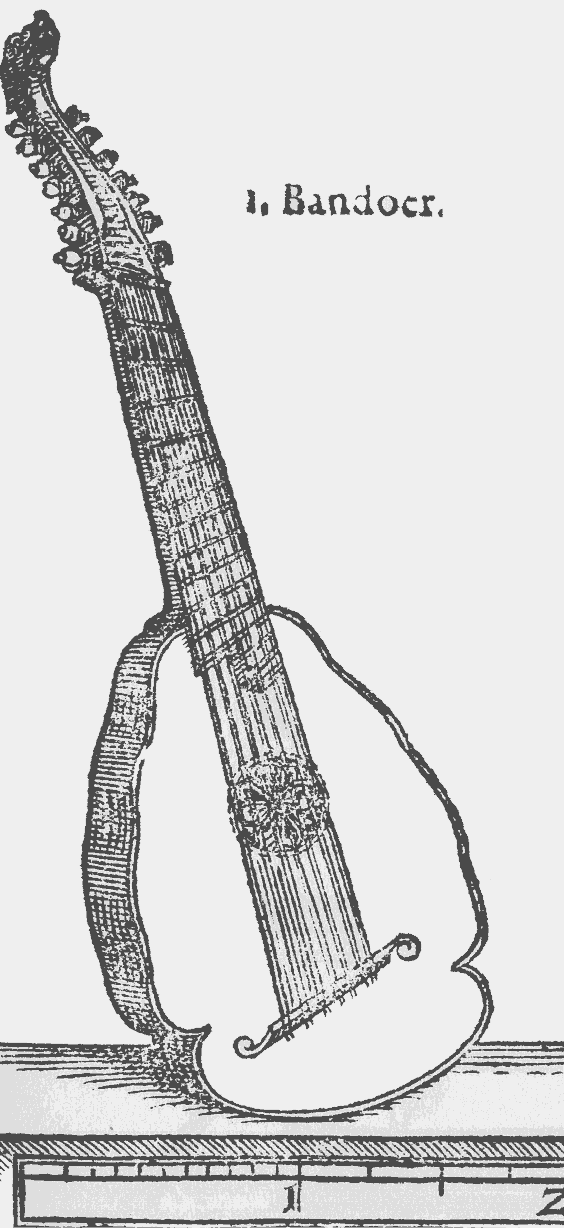
illustration from Syntagma Musicum Theatrum Instrumentorum seu Sciagraphia, Wolfenbüttel, 1620CE.

The bandora or bandore is a large long-necked plucked string-instrument that can be regarded as a bass cittern though it does not have the re-entrant tuning typical of the cittern. Probably first built by John Rose in England around 1560, it remained popular for over a century. A somewhat smaller version was the orpharion.

The bandora is frequently one of the two bass instruments in a broken consort as associated with the works of Thomas Morley, and it is also a solo instrument in its own right. Anthony Holborne wrote many pieces for solo bandora. The multiple lute settings of Pacoloni appear both with and without optional wire-strung instruments.

== Construction and type ==
The bandora, though built like a cittern, had six or seven courses (unison pairs) of strings tuned in a more lute-like fashion, but without the high d found on a bass lute. In fact, the barring is very close to an orpharion, and closer to contemporary lute than to cittern or guitar construction. This creates a proportion closer to present guitar tunings; typically C D G C E A, and occasionally a seventh low G string.

Thomas Morley calls for a "Pandora" in his Consort Lessons. The term bandore and bandora were occasionally incorrectly applied to a Ukrainian folk instrument now more commonly known as the bandura, an instrument with up to 68 strings that differs considerably from the bandora.

During the Renaissance there were no naming conventions and terms were used loosely. The Spanish bandurria, though this term was once also interchangeable, now applies to a treble instrument like a mandolin - a similar confusion as has occurred with mandore, mandora, mandola (q.v.). All these instruments are thought to derive their names originally from the ancient Greek pandura (which term, once again, is found applied to a variety of stringed instruments in different regions at an early date).

== Bibliography ==
- Masakata Kanazawa, (ed.), The Complete works of Anthony Holborne, Vol. 1, Music for Lute and Bandora, (Harvard University Press, 1967).
- Nordstrom, Lyle, The Bandora: Its music and sources, (Harmonie Park Press, Warren MI, 1992).
