= Shakespeare Songs (Alfred Deller album) =

Studio album by Alfred Deller
- Released: 1967
- Recorded: September 1966
- Studio: All Saints' Church, Boughton Aluph
- Genre: Classical music
- Producer: Peter Willemoës

Shakespeare Songs is a 1967 LP album of Elizabethan songs which is one of the most celebrated recordings of the countertenor Alfred Deller. Deller is accompanied by lutenist Desmond Dupré and the Deller Consort, Philip Todd and Max Worthley tenors, Maurice Bevan baritone.

The album includes both anonymous songs adapted by Shakespeare, such as the Willow song, and also songs by Shakespeare's contemporaries which may have been written for his plays. Robert Johnson, a composer and lutenist who set two songs from The Tempest, is known to have worked for Shakespeare's company the King's Men, whereas Thomas Morley's setting of "It Was A Lover And His Lass" from As You Like It, is not known to have been performed in the play, but may have been.

== Track list ==
1. – Thomas Morley "It Was A Lover And His Lass" 2:53 from As You Like It V, 3
2. – John Wilson "Take, O Take Those Lips Away" 1:31 Measure for Measure, IV, 1
3. – Thomas Morley "O Mistress Mine" 1:21 Twelfth Night, II, 3
4. – Thomas Weelkes "Strike It Up, Tabor" 1:38 -
5. – Anonymous "Willow song" 4:53 Othello, IV, 3
6. – Robert Johnson "Where The Bee Sucks" 1:20 The Tempest, VI, 1
7. – Anonymous "How Should I Your True Love Know?" 1:49 Hamlet IV, 5
8. – Francis Cutting "Walsingham variations" 2:57 instrumental
9. – Anonymous "We Be Soldiers Three" 1:56
10. – Anonymous "When Griping Griefs" 2:58 Romeo and Juliet, IV, 5
11. – Robert Johnson "Full Fathom Five" 1:57 The Tempest, I, 2
12. – Anonymous "Caleno custure me" 3:10 Henry V (play), not sung but mentioned at IV, 4
13. – Anonymous "Then They For Sudden Joy Did Weep" 1:22 King Lear, I
14. – Anonymous "Bonny Sweet Robin" 0:44 instrumental
15. – Anonymous The Wind and the Rain "When that I was a little tiny boy" 2:27 Twelfth Night, V, 1
16. – Anonymous "Kemp's Jig" 0:50 instrumental
17. – Anonymous "Greensleeves" 3:22
18. – Anonymous "He That Will An Alehouse Keep" 0:57 from Ravenscroft's Melismas
19. –William Byrd "Non Nobis Domine" 1:18
