= Music in the plays of William Shakespeare =

Music in the plays of William Shakespeare includes both music incidental to the plot, as song and dance, and also additional supplied both by Shakespeare's own company and subsequent performers. This music is distinct from musical settings of Shakespeare's sonnets by later composers.

== Music in Shakespeare's own theatre productions ==
=== Songs as text within the plays ===
The following are among the most notable examples of songs in Shakespeare's plays:

- "Full Fathom Five" in The Tempest, I, 2
- "How Should I Your True Love Know?" in Hamlet IV, 5
- "It Was a Lover and His Lass" in As You Like It V, 3
- "O Mistress Mine" in Twelfth Night, II, 3
- "Sigh No More" in Much Ado About Nothing, II, 3
- "Take, O Take Those Lips Away" in Measure for Measure, IV, 1
- "Then They for Sudden Joy Did Weep" in King Lear, I, 4
- "The Wind and the Rain" in Twelfth Night, V, 1
- "Under the Greenwood Tree" in As You Like It, II, 5
- "When Griping Griefs" in Romeo and Juliet, IV, 5
- "Where the Bee Sucks" in The Tempest, V, 1
- "Willow song" in Othello, IV, 3

=== Other songs mentioned within the plays ===
- "Caleno custure me" not sung but mentioned in Henry V, IV, 4
- “Greensleeves" in The Merry Wives of Windsor, V, 5.
- "Heart's Ease" in Romeo and Juliet, IV, 5.102

=== Dance ===
Among the dances associated with Shakespeare's company is "Kemp's Jig" named after the actor Will Kemp.

== Music for later theatre productions ==
The generations after Shakespeare saw many composers create or arrange incidental music and song settings for his plays. Among the most notable were Thomas Morley, Henry Purcell, Matthew Locke, Thomas Arne, William Linley, Sir Henry Bishop, and Sir Arthur Sullivan. Felix Mendelssohn’s overture to A Midsummer Night’s Dream (1826) was a descriptive piece intended for concert performance, though he later added incidental music for a production of the play in 1843.

The Shakespearian music of the 19th century was more often associated with the opera house or concert hall than with productions of the plays. In the early 20th century Elizabethan music began to be used as incidental music in a bid for more authenticity. Gradually some new scores were introduced. Vaughan Williams was engaged to write incidental music at Stratford between 1912 and 1913. Rosabel Watson directed and arranged music for many productions at Stratford and elsewhere.

A Shakespeare Music Catalogue (1991) lists over 20,000 items of theatrical and non-theatrical music associated with Shakespeare, much of it unpublished.

== Recordings ==
Attempts at reconstructing and performing the "original" songs from the plays and related folk songs have been recorded by various musicians, from Shakespeare Songs by Alfred Deller (1967), to the recordings of Philip Pickett.
