= Mark Deller =

- Born: 1938 (age 87–88); St Leonards-on-Sea, Sussex, England

Mark Deller (born 1938) is an English conductor and countertenor, now retired. He is the son of the first modern countertenor, Alfred Deller.

== Life and career ==
Mark Deller and his parents moved to Canterbury, Kent, just before his first birthday. Alfred was a lay clerk at Canterbury Cathedral in the 1940s, and his young son also joined the cathedral choir, although Alfred transferred to the choir of St Paul's Cathedral in London about the time that Mark became a chorister at Canterbury. Mark went on to win a scholarship at St John's College, Cambridge, which is famous for its choir

After completing his education, Deller pursued a musical career. Initially based in Salisbury, he performed concerts in Europe, the US and South America. In 1962 he became a member of the Deller Consort.

In England, Deller has been particularly active in Kent. Deller became a member of the Ashford Choral Society after receiving an appointment to the choir of St Paul's Cathedral. In 1970 Deller became conductor of the Ashford Choral Society. He has served as director of the Canterbury Festival and the Stour Music Festival. Abroad he has conducted the Netherlands Bach Society, the Associação de Canto Coral in Rio de Janeiro, Les Chœurs de la Pléiade in Paris, and the opening for Europa Cantat in Belgium.

== Discography ==
While his singing career has tended to be with ensembles rather than as a soloist, Deller's discography includes solo performances of note:

- Baroque music
  - John Dowland Ayres & Lute Lessons (with the Deller Consort), Harmonia Mundi
  - Henry Purcell's duet Sound the Trumpet from the birthday ode Come Ye Sons of Art. The Dellers, father and son, feature as the two countertenor soloists on a Vanguard recording (reissued on CD).
  - Handel's dramatic oratorio Semele.
- Folk
  - Folksongs (album)
