= O Mistress Mine =

Elizabethan song in Shakespeare play

"O Mistress Mine" is an Elizabethan song that appears in Shakespeare's play Twelfth Night. It is sung by the character Feste, who is asked to sing a love song by Sir Andrew Aguecheek and Sir Toby Belch. The words of the song are addressed to the singer/poet's lover.

The lyric is often assumed to be by Shakespeare, although he could have been referencing an existing song. The play's first documented performance was in 1602. There is an instrumental piece entitled O Mistress Mine by Shakespeare's contemporary Thomas Morley which appeared in 1599. There has been speculation that Morley was commissioned to provide music for the play. Whether or not this was the case, Shakespearean scholars think that Morley's publication predates the first performance of the play. There is also a set of variations on the tune by William Byrd, another contemporary of Shakespeare. This version is included in the Fitzwilliam Virginal Book, a manuscript which it is not possible to date exactly.

== Publication ==
=== Music ===
Morley held a printing patent (a type of copyright protection) and published the tune in First Booke of Consort Lessons (1599). The tune has to be tweaked slightly to fit Shakespeare's words. The following year, Morley published a song book with a setting of It Was A Lover And His Lass from As You Like It.

=== Words ===
The playTwelfth Night was first published in the First Folio (1623). The text appears in Act 2, Scene 3.

== Text ==
O mistress mine, where are you roaming?
O, stay and hear; your true-love's coming,
That can sing both high and low:
Trip no further, pretty sweeting;
Journeys end in lovers' meeting,
Every wise man's son doth know.

What is love? 'tis not hereafter;
Present mirth hath present laughter;
What's to come is still unsure:
In delay there lies no plenty;
Then come kiss me, sweet-and-twenty,
Youth's a stuff will not endure.

== Recordings ==
The song is included in Alfred Deller's album Shakespeare Songs.
