= Folk song (disambiguation) =

Folk song or Folksong or Folksongs refers to a song in the traditional or contemporary folk music genre.

Folk Songs may also refer to:

- Folk Song, a pastiche song recorded by Bernard Cribbins in 1960
- Folk Songs (Berio), a 1964 song cycle by Luciano Berio
- Folk Songs, a composition by Eric Mandat
- Folksongs (Alfred Deller album), 1972
- Folksongs, a 2000 album by Anne Sofie von Otter
- Folk Songs, and album by Wilfred Brown and John Williams, 1998
- Folk Songs (Charlie Haden album), 1979
- Folk Songs (Kronos Quartet album), with guest vocalists Sam Amidon, Olivia Chaney, Rhiannon Giddens, and Natalie Merchant, 2017
- Folk Songs (James Yorkston album), 2009
