= Boughton Lees =

Village in Kent, England

Coordinates: 51°11′19″N 0°53′31″E

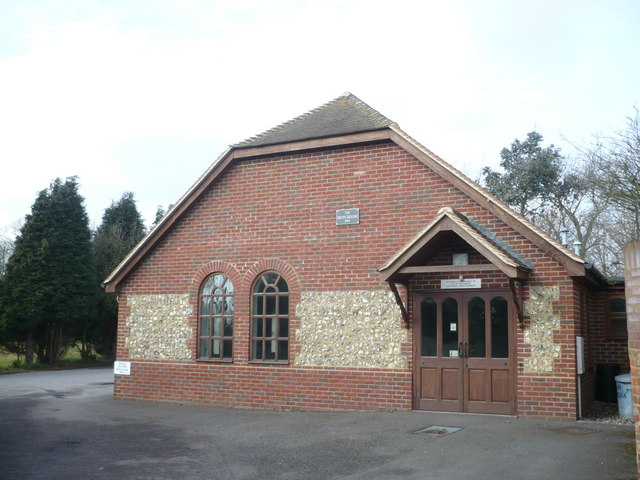
- Village hall

- Location within Kent
- OS grid reference: TR025475
- Civil parish: Boughton Aluph
- District: Ashford
- Shire county: Kent
- Region: South East
- Country: England
- Sovereign state: United Kingdom
- Post town: TONBRIDGE
- Postcode district: TN25
- Dialling code: 01233
- Police: Kent
- Fire: Kent
- Ambulance: South East Coast
- UK Parliament: Weald of Kent

Boughton Lees is a village in the civil parish of Boughton Aluph, Ashford District, Kent, England. It stands on the main Ashford-Faversham road, some 3.5 miles (5.6 km) north of Ashford.

The village church is Saint Christopher's Church, while the nearby All Saints’ Church, Boughton Aluph is the venue for the Stour Music Festival. Cricket has been played on the village green, The Lees, for over 200 years.

The Eastwell Manor, a country-house hotel, is situated on the edge of the village in Eastwell Park.
