= Night Prayer =

Night Prayer may refer to:

- Isha prayer, the night-time daily prayer obligatory in Islam
- Compline, a canonical hour prayed by Christians at the end of the day
- Evening Prayer (disambiguation), various meanings
