= Show choir =

Musical ensemble combining dance and choral singing

A show choir (previously known as a "swing choir") is a musical ensemble that combines choral singing with choreographed dance, often integrated into a narrative story or overarching theme.

== Origin ==
Show choirs have been popularized by the American television show Glee but have a longer history dating back to glee clubs in London in the 18th century, musical theatre, music in the plays of William Shakespeare and the theatre of ancient Greece.

== Location ==
Show choirs sing music as a type of performing arts, for example as secondary school activities in the United States. They are typically co-curricular activity (part of a class or connected to the academic curriculum) or an extracurricular activity. Alternate examples include organizations formed outside of a school, such as community choirs that make use of students from multiple schools in the surrounding area. Though usually a high school activity, show choirs exist at all levels of school from elementary through the collegiate level.

Outside of the United States, show choirs can be found in countries such as Canada, Mexico, United Kingdom, Ireland, Philippines, and Argentina.

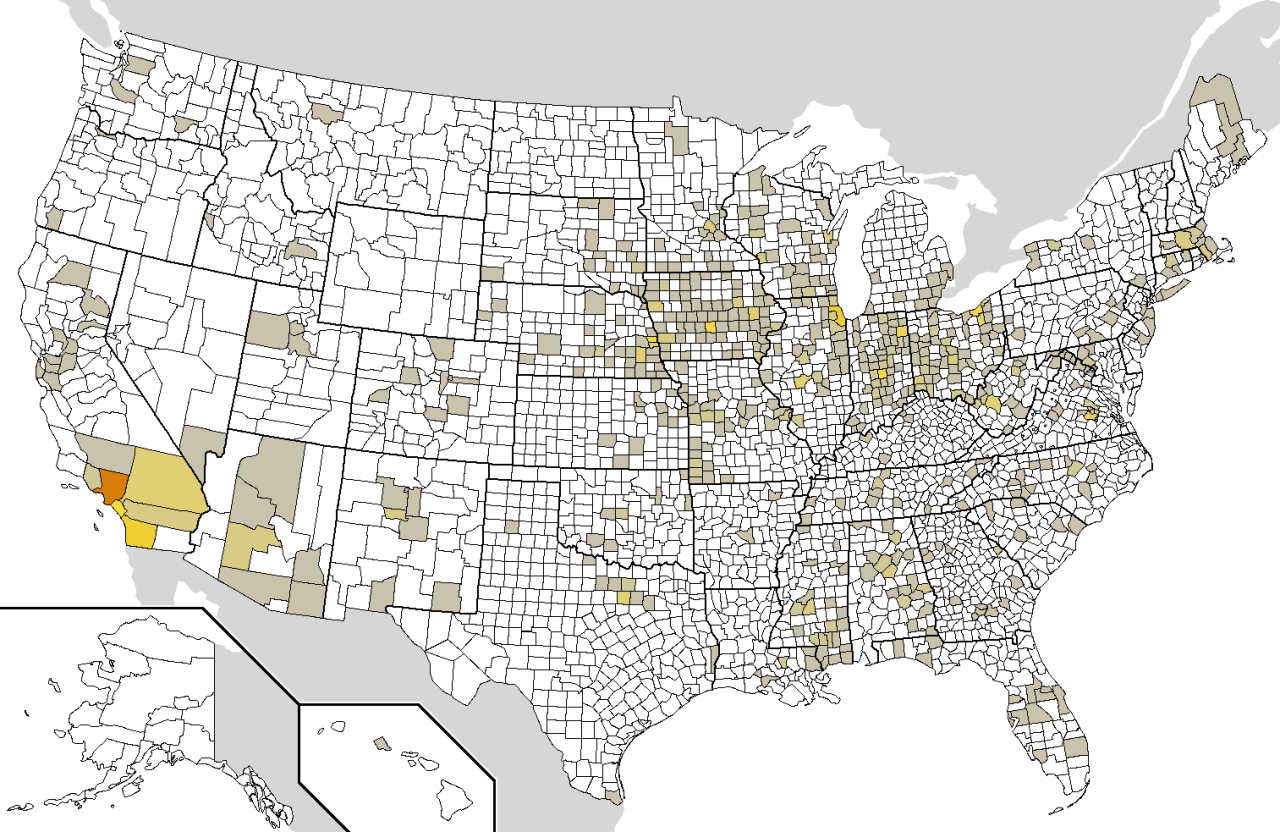
Counties in the United States with at least one Show Choir program.

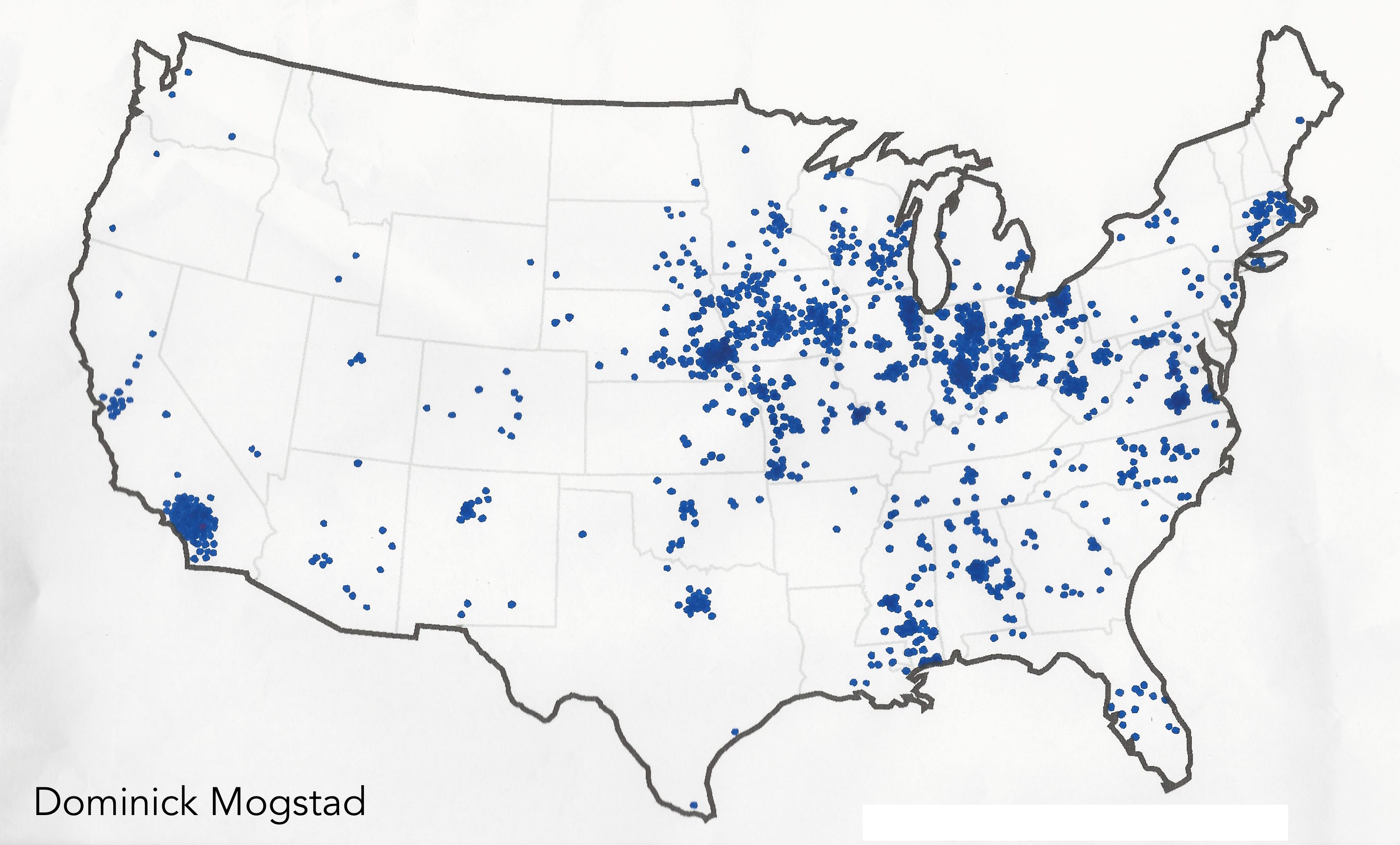
Relative positions of every past and present registered high school with at least one show choir in the United States (excluding Hawaii and Alaska) as of November, 2015 (courtesy showchoir.com).

== Overview ==
While there is no standard requirement for the number of performers or demographic of its students, a show choir typically consists of thirty to sixty singer/dancers. Factors like school size and/or director preferences may impact this number. Larger schools with more advanced programs may have more than one competitive show choir ensemble. Show choirs composed entirely of students of one gender usually compete in separate divisions from mixed-gender show choirs, with the exception of "open" divisions, where groups of different types compete against each other.

=== Costumes ===
Show choir performers traditionally wear costumes, though the definition of what is considered a costume in this context is broad. Costumes range from conservative looks (such as formal tuxedos and ball gowns) to modern (tracksuits with name-brand sneakers) to avant-garde fashion (such as modern head-to-toe uniforms or revealing clothing). Additionally, many larger groups include two or more costumes in their show. Singer/dancers typically wear stage makeup and shoes conducive to dancing (called "character shoes").

=== Appearance ===
Uniformity in look among performers is often an important characteristic of the genre. In most cases, there is consistency in costuming and makeup from person to person; this consistency extends to elements like hair, where singer/dancers will all style their hair in a visually consistent way.

=== Band ===
The choir usually has a backup band (often called the "show band", "pit" or "combo" if it includes a horn section) providing instrumental music to accompany the singers' voices. Instrumentation selection often varies between choirs and even from one group's song selection to another, but a common show choir band consists of trumpets, trombone, alto/soprano sax, tenor sax, piano, and synthesizer, guitar, bass, auxiliary percussion, and a drum set. Bands may include other instruments such as violin or cello if their show requires it. The band is usually situated behind the performance area for the singer/dancers, but occasionally, a group will bring out members of the band onstage to accentuate thematic elements in the show.

=== Stage crew ===
A "tech crew" or "stage crew" is also standard with most show choirs. A stage crew is composed of stage hands who handle aspects such as lighting, sound, and the stage setup. During a show, crew members' responsibilities include tasks such as helping performers change costumes, managing props, handing out microphones, running special effects, and other duties set out in the design of the show.

== Competitions ==
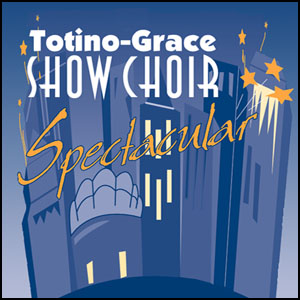
The cover of a program from Totino-Grace High School in 2010.

Many show choirs participate in competitions, sometimes called "invitationals" (though most are not invitation-only events) or "festivals". These competitions are often held at the high school where the "host group" attends and sometimes performs as an exhibition. Though some events are held at auditoriums or other facilities that can accommodate larger crowds and provide better acoustic performance.

Competitions can be as small as a showcase of a few groups from the immediate geographic area or they can feature many groups from multiple states. Because of the vast difference in sizes of the competitions, they can last a single afternoon or span an entire weekend. Competitions may separate competing choirs into different divisions. These divisions are often determined by age, skill level, size of the school or choir, and/or gender of the participants. The different divisions may take place at a different time, day, or at a different location or venue, though usually within the same school or close geographic area.

Show choir shows or "sets" can be presented in a multitude of ways, from a more traditional approach to modern theatrical performances that tell full-length stories. These performances are often created by the choir's director, but can stem from the imagination of a group's choreographer or even outside performing arts professionals as well. As show choir has evolved, an increasing number of schools have invested a great deal of effort in creating quality sets that can be compared to professional stage shows.

Many competitions include a preliminary round and a finals round. Middle school competitions do not hold a finals round. The winner from each division is chosen from the first and only round of performance. In high school, the finals round commences after awards from the preliminary round are complete, where the top scoring groups perform again to compete for the title of Grand Champion of the contest. The number of groups in the finals round is up to the hosting school, but typically 5–6 choirs participate. Because they have another opportunity to perform, these groups are given the opportunity to take suggestions from their critique judge (the judge that talk to the groups directly after the performance) and make adjustments to their finals performance to earn a better score. There are other judges that also score the show choirs and give them feedback for later. This feedback is given to the director, and is used to make deeper changes to the show during rehearsal hours. Hosting schools do not compete in the competition for ethical purposes. However, they will often showcase their own show choir as an "exhibition," separate from the competing schools. This typically happens either before finals are announced and first awards, or before final awards. Sometimes a hosting school with multiple groups may have multiple exhibitions.

The adjudicators (or judges) at these competitions are usually high school choir/music teachers, show choir directors, choreographers, arrangers, or performers from Broadway-style musicals. Judging is largely subjective and is based on a scoring style selected by the hosts. It is typical for competition scoresheets to place more emphasis on the quality of choral sound, while others delegate more points to other aspects of the show like the quality of visuals/choreography, band, and show design. Depending on the competition, an adjudicator may only judge their area of expertise (a choir director judging vocals, while a choreographer judging dance), or they may adjudicate all areas of the score sheet. Additionally, a separate judge may be added to the panel to judge the bands, and/or to select outstanding performers for separate awards (often referred to as "caption" awards). Comparing different forms of art comes with an inherent subjectiveness, so it is not uncommon for judges or geographical regions to bias certain styles of shows. This sometimes leads to groups not competing out-of-state – a group from the south may not place well at a competition in the Midwest since the Midwest region tends to put more emphasize on vocals while southern regions put more emphasis on visuals.

At many competitions, there are also individual, or solo competitions which take place. They take place during the main competition in a different area than the show choir performances. Winners are announced, and they may perform at the start of the finals performance.

== Characteristics of a performance ==
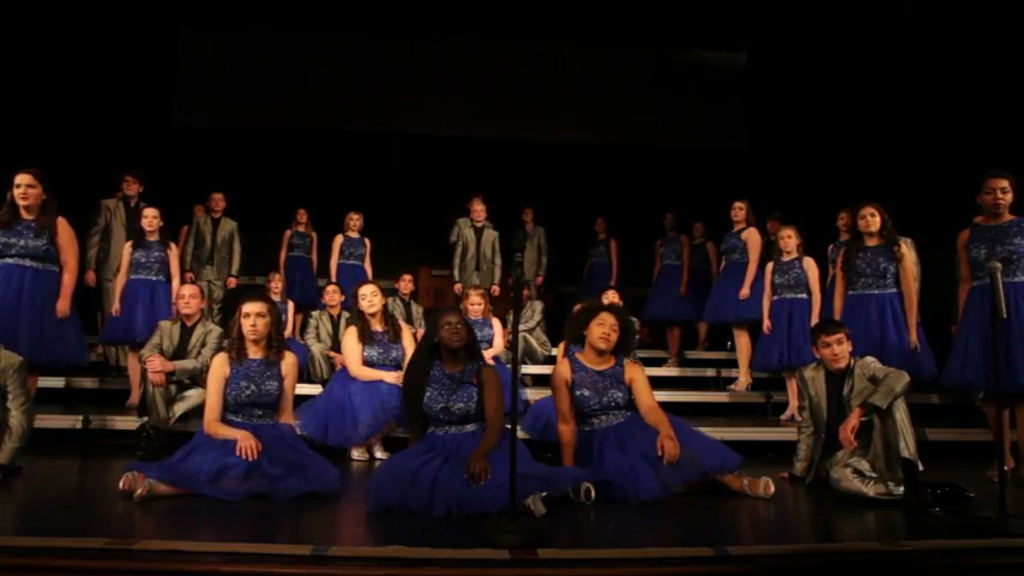
Des Moines Lincoln High School performing in 2017.

Most show choir shows consist of a variety of musical selections, often including several choreographed, fast-paced pieces and one slower piece performed with limited or no choreography. This slower number—usually a ballad—exists primarily to showcase the ensemble's singing ability. In California, it is a requirement that at least one minute of any one set be sung a cappella (it is usually one full song in the set), though this is not a standard in the rest of the country. More often than not, the a cappella selection is also the ballad, as it is much easier to sing unaccompanied while holding relatively still. In the Midwest, it is becoming popular to set one song aside as a "novelty" piece, designed to make the audience laugh. "Concept" or "story" shows that unify all of the songs together in a common theme are becoming popular across the country.

Within a song, vocal lines typically alternate between unison or octave singing, and two-or-more-part polyphonic harmony. Songs are chosen, adapted, and arranged from a variety of sources including popular music, jazz standards, and Broadway musicals, but rarely make use of classical music. Original music has also been performed by a small number of groups. Additionally, there is often at least one solo in each performance by a standout singer in the group. Rarely you can also find a solo interpretive dancer.

Competitive performance sets range in length, but are usually timed to total between fifteen and twenty-five minutes. Shows generally consist of, but are not limited to, approximately five songs. Middle school shows usually contain four to five songs. In a high school group, the fourth song is usually the ballad (meaning slower song, and either no or little dancing). In a middle school group, the third or fourth song (if they have 4 or 5 songs respectively) is the ballad. For both the first song is called the opener, and the last song the closer.

== Popularity ==
Show choirs have seen a rise in popularity since the American television series Glee was released. The television show is based around the workings of a fictional show choir. Glee creator, Ryan Murphy, invited Burbank High School's 2008 advanced mixed choir, In Sync, to film their award-winning Disco Medley to be featured as a flashback from Mr. Schuester's time in high school glee club. Some individuals feel the television show does not accurately represent the environment of a real show choir.

== In the media ==
Central Sound, a show choir from Lawrence Central High School in Indianapolis, Indiana, was featured on a 2009 episode of the MTV television series, "Made." In the episode, the choir is raising money to attend FAME Chicago, a national show choir competition. Sing All About It is a show choir competition located in Sioux City, Iowa, that is hosted by their four teams: The Headliners, Prestige, Entourage, and New Sound. This competition was noticed by several news stations and they interviewed some of the students. 4 KTIV is a Siouxland news station that promoted the competition. There are over 1,500 students who perform and compete to try to win Grand Champion.

== Staging ==
Show choir is usually performed on stage risers, a series of platforms set up on a stage. The usual configuration at competitions is made up of four, 4’x 8′ sections, three tiers high (with tier heights averaging 8″, 16″ or 24″). This helps to provide easy use and audience sight lines to all performers (including the back row). Larger show choirs sometimes add additional platforms, stairs, boxes, backdrops, and/or other set pieces to complement their show.

== Participation of low-voiced singers ==
To achieve a full choral sound with rich melodies and tonal variety, mixed-gender show choirs need low voices to cover all vocal parts. One study done by the Choral Journal investigated the participation of male high school students in show choirs in the Midwestern U.S.. It found that many boys were discouraged from participating because their communities considered participation in show choir to violate expected masculine gender norms. Factors that increased the participation and satisfaction of male students included a fun environment, charismatic director, and participation in choir competitions.

== Commitment ==
For many high school students, show choir is a large commitment that takes over a large part of a school year. For some, show choir is part of the school curriculum and is a class taught during the day. For others, it is an extracurricular activity that requires practice to take place before or after school. Practices may begin as early as the summer, while other choirs don't start until much later. The competitive season takes place from January until April, with competitions held across the country every weekend during that time.

== Images ==
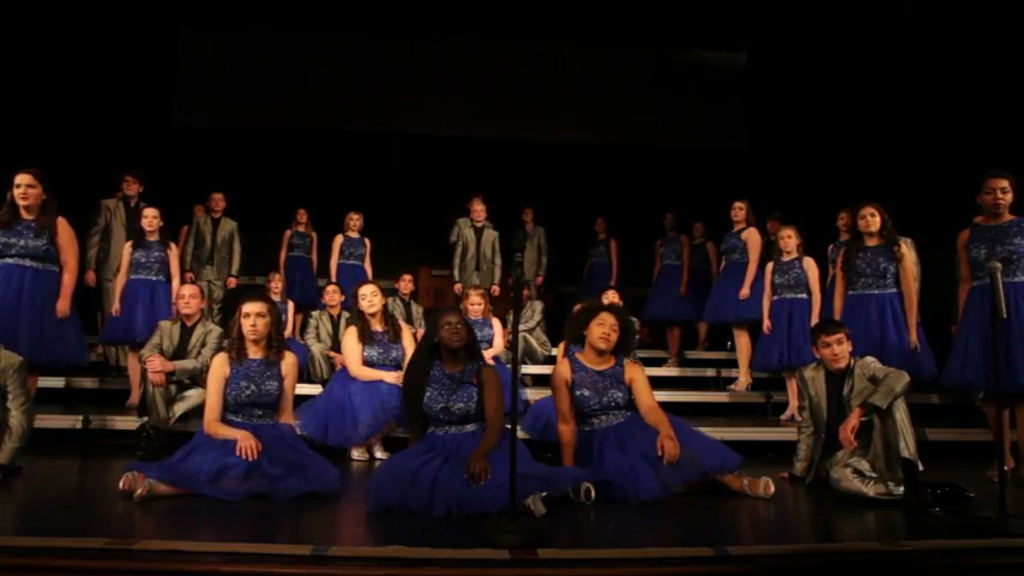
Des Moines Lincoln Show Choir in 2017

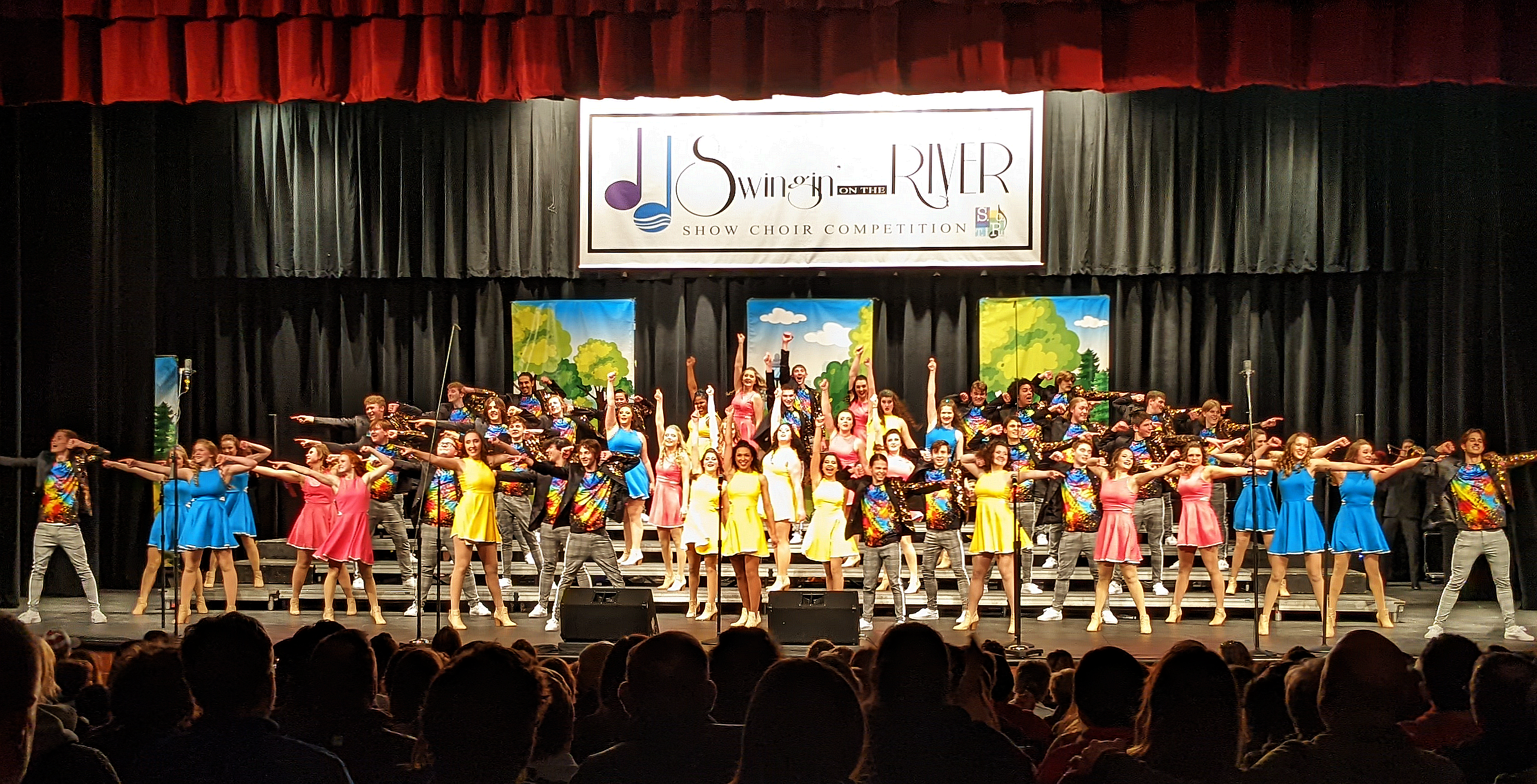
Riverside Company show choir, 2022
