= Boughton Aluph =

Village in Kent, England

Coordinates: 51°11′50″N 0°54′36″E

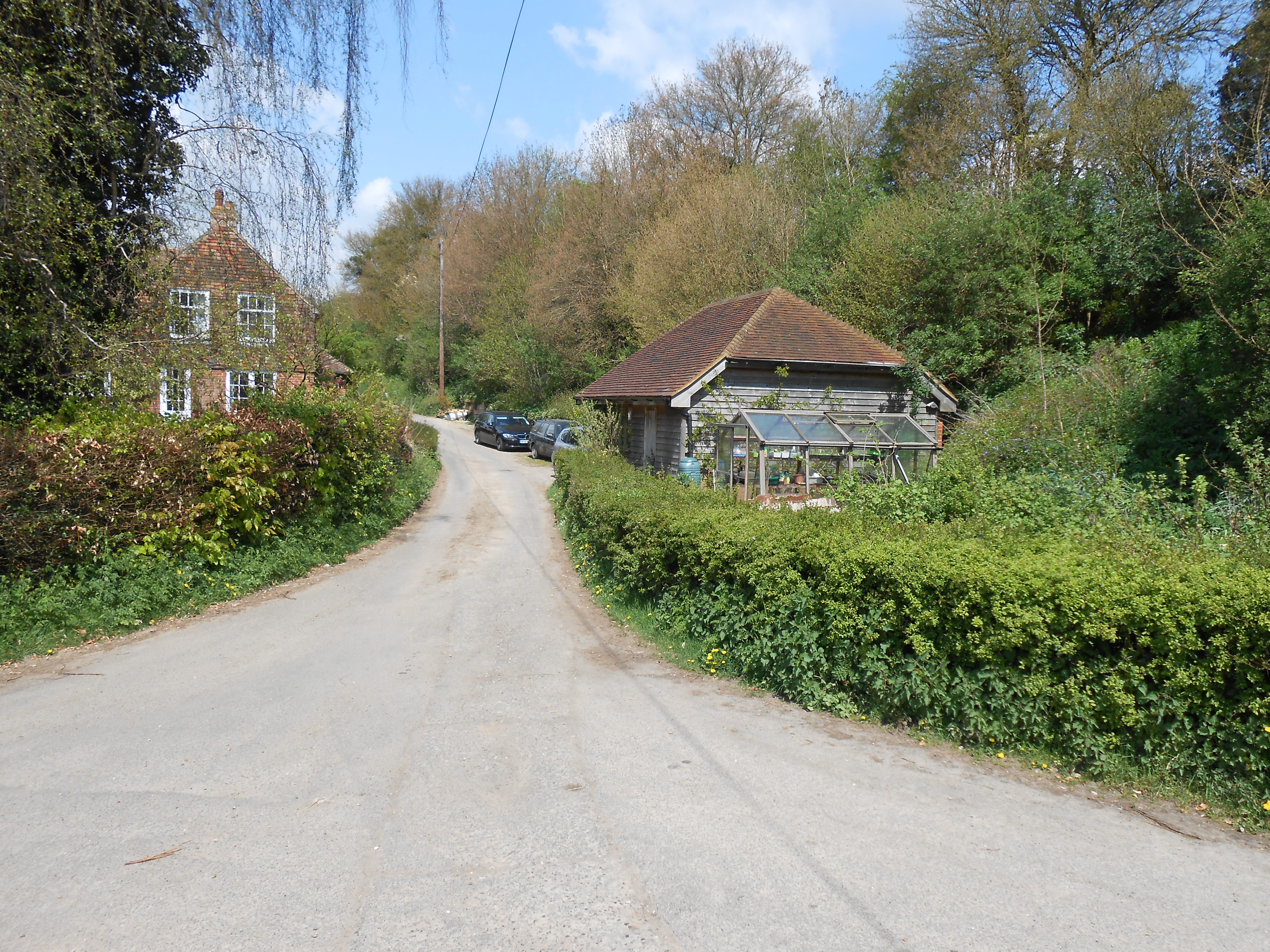
- Brewhouse Lane, Boughton Aluph

- Location within Kent
- Area: 9.93 km^{2} (3.83 sq mi)
- Population: 2,490 (Civil Parish 2011)
  - Density: 251/km^{2} (650/sq mi)
- OS grid reference: TR035485
- Civil parish: Boughton Aluph
- District: Ashford
- Shire county: Kent
- Region: South East
- Country: England
- Sovereign state: United Kingdom
- Post town: Ashford
- Postcode district: TN25
- Dialling code: 01233
- Police: Kent
- Fire: Kent
- Ambulance: South East Coast
- UK Parliament: Weald of Kent
- Website: Boughton Aluph & Eastwell Parish Council

Boughton Aluph (pronounced Bawton Alluf) is a village and civil parish in the Borough of Ashford in Kent, England, and is about 5 miles (8 km) north of Ashford on the A251 road. There are two villages within the parish: Boughton Aluph itself, and Boughton Lees. Boughton Corner is a small hamlet within the parish, further east on the A28 road. At its south-western end, the parish also contains part of the built up area of Ashford. The parish shared a grouped parish council with the neighbouring parish of Eastwell. In 2011 the parish had a population of 2490.

== Toponymy ==
The place-name 'Boughton Aluph' is first attested as 'Boltune' in the Domesday Book of 1086, as 'Boctune' in the related Domesday Monachorum, and as 'Botun Alou' in the Close Rolls of 1237. 'Boughton' means 'town or settlement where beeches grew'; the village was held by one Alulf in 1211–12, the name being a variant of the Old German 'Adalulf'.

== Amenities ==
There are three places of worship:

- All Saints' Church
- Saint Christopher's Church (in Boughton Lees)
- Boughton Baptist chapel.

== Governance ==
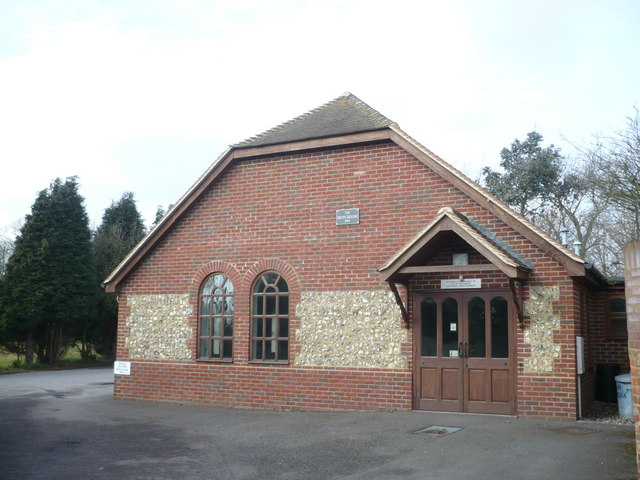
The Iron Room, the village hall in Boughton Lees

There are three tiers of local government covering Boughton Aluph, at parish, district and county level: Boughton Aluph and Eastwell Parish Council, Ashford Borough Council, and Kent County Council. The parish council is a grouped parish council, covering the two parishes of Eastwell and Boughton Aluph. It meets at the village hall in Boughton Lees, known as the Iron Room.

== Notable residents ==
- Rear Admiral Derek Anthony MBE
- Alfred Deller, CBE (1912–1979), professional singer and countertenor. He is buried in the churchyard.
- Matthew King (composer)

== See also ==
- Listed buildings in Boughton Aluph
