= Willow song (disambiguation) =

The Willow song is an Elizabethan folk song used by Shakespeare in his play Othello.

Willow song may also refer to:

- the "Willow song" from Otello (Rossini)
- the "Willow song" from Otello (Verdi)
