= The Tailor and the Mouse =

English folk song

"The Tailor and the Mouse" (Roud 16577) is an English folk song.

== Text and melody ==
There was a tailor had a mouse
Hi diddle um come feed-al
They lived together in one house
Hi diddle um come feed-al

Chorus (after each verse)
Hi diddle um come tarum tirum,
Through the town of Ramsey,
Hi diddle um come over the lea,
Hi diddle um come feed-al

The tailor thought his mouse was ill
Hi diddle um come feed-al
He gave him part of a blue pill
Hi diddle um come feed-al

The tailor thought the mouse would die
Hi diddle um come feed-al
He baked him in an apple pie
Hi diddle um come feed-al

The pie was cut, the mouse ran out
Hi diddle um come feed-al
The tailor chased him all about
Hi diddle um come feed-al

The tailor found his mouse was dead
Hi diddle um come feed-al
So he bought another one in his stead
Hi diddle um come feed-al

== Recordings ==
- Sweet England, Shirley Collins, 1959
- Folksongs, Alfred Deller, 1972
- Burl Ives Sings Little White Duck and Other Children's Favorites, Burl Ives, 1959
- There Was a Man Lived in the Moon, Jane Sheldon (soprano), Teddy Tahu Rhodes (baritone), arranged by Andrew Ford, 2015
