= Evening Prayer =

Evening Prayer refers to:

Evening Prayer (Anglican), an Anglican liturgical service which takes place after midday, generally late afternoon or evening. When significant components of the liturgy are sung, the service is referred to as "Evensong".

"Evening prayer" may also refer to:

- Ma'ariv, the evening prayer in Judaism. See Jewish services
- Maghrib prayer, the obligatory prayer in Islam offered in the evening
- Vespers, the Christian service of evening prayer celebrated in the Roman Catholic, Lutheran and Adventist denominations

== Art ==
- Evening prayer, a painting by Anna Ancher

== Music ==
- "Evening Prayer", List of compositions by Modest Mussorgsky
- "Evening prayer" Folksongs (Alfred Deller album)
