= Bushes and Briars =

English folk song

"Bushes and Briars" is an English folksong (Roud 1027). A phonograph recording was supposedly made in 1904 of Mrs Humphreys of Ingrave, Essex by Lucy Broadwood and Ralph Vaughan Williams, although the version available in the British Library Sound Archive is more likely to be of Broadwood herself. The recording of Mrs Humphreys was included in 1998 on the EFDSS anthology "A Century of Song".

Vaughan Williams published an arrangement in 1908.

A version collected at Piddlehinton, Dorset, in 1905 was printed in James Reeves's The Everlasting Circle, 1960. The song was included in Barry Skinner's 1978 album Bushes & Briars (Fellside FE011).

Sandy Denny’s song of the same name on her album Sandy is unrelated.

== Recordings ==
- Folksongs (Alfred Deller album)

== Popular culture ==
A version of the song recorded by vocalist Breda Mayock was used in the track West in Motion by Irish house music producers Bumble (Mother Records, 1992). The first two lines of the song in this recording were subsequently sampled by hardcore producer DJ Seduction in the track "Sub Dub" (Impact Records, 1992).
