= Folksongs (Alfred Deller album) =

Studio album by Alfred Deller
- Released: 1972
- Recorded: Boughton Aluph, 1971
- Genre: Folk song
- Length: 39'35 (LP) 40'09 (CD)
- Label: Harmonia Mundi France

Folksongs is a 1972 album by the countertenor Alfred Deller with his son Mark Deller and lutenist Desmond Dupré. In addition to actual folksongs it includes three songs composed by Thomas Morley and one by Robert Jones.

== Track listing ==
1. "The Three Ravens" – Alfred Deller & Desmond Dupré (2:52)
2. "Black is the Colour of My True Love's Hair" – Alfred Deller & Desmond Dupré (1:53 )
3. "Sweet Nymph, Come to thy Lover" Thomas Morley – Alfred Deller, Desmond Dupré and Mark Deller (1:41)
4. "I go before my darling" by Thomas Morley – Alfred Deller, Mark Deller and Desmond Dupré (1:26)
5. "The Oak and the Ash" – Alfred Deller & Desmond Dupré (3:11)
6. "Barbara Allen" – Alfred Deller & Desmond Dupré (2:36)
7. "Lord Randall" – Alfred Deller & Desmond Dupré (4:04)
8. "The Water Is Wide" (English version of Waly, Waly) – Alfred Deller & Desmond Dupré (2:35)
9. "The Tailor and the Mouse" – Alfred Deller & Desmond Dupré (1:31)
10. "Down by the Sally Gardens" – Alfred Deller & Desmond Dupré (2:21)
11. "I Will Give my Love an Apple" – Alfred Deller & Desmond Dupré (1:47)
12. "Miraculous Love's wounding" by Thomas Morley – Alfred Deller, Desmond Dupré and Mark Deller (2:57 )
13. "Sweet Kate" by Robert Jones – Alfred Deller, Mark Deller and Desmond Dupré (1:36)
14. "Bushes and Briars" (collected by Vaughan Williams 1908) – Alfred Deller & Desmond Dupré (2:36 )
15. "The Foggy, Foggy Dew" – Alfred Deller & Desmond Dupré (2:10)
16. "She Moved Through the Fair" – Alfred Deller & Desmond Dupré (3:44 )
17. "Evening Prayer" – Alfred Deller & Desmond Dupré
