= Listed buildings in Boughton Aluph =

Civil Parish in Kent, England

Boughton Aluph is a village and civil parish in the Borough of Ashford of Kent, England. It contains one grade I, one grade II* and 35 grade II listed buildings that are recorded in the National Heritage List for England.

This list is based on the information retrieved online from Historic England

== Key ==
Grade	Criteria
I	Buildings that are of exceptional interest
II*	Particularly important buildings of more than special interest
II	Buildings that are of special interest

== Listing ==
Name	Grade	Location	Type	Completed (Note: The date given is the date used by Historic England as significant for the initial building or that of an important part in the structure's description.)	Date designated	Grid ref. (Note: The grid reference is based on the British national grid reference system, sometimes known as OSGB36, used by the Ordnance Survey.) Geo-coordinates	Notes	Entry number (Note: The "List Entry Number" is a unique number assigned to each listed building and scheduled monument by Historic England.)	Image	Wikidata
Jacketts Field	II				13 August 1984	TR0319249686; 51°12′37″N 0°54′28″E		1071314	Upload Photo	Q26326421
Barn 30 Yards East of Buckwell	II	Canterbury Road			13 August 1984	TR0433448276; 51°11′50″N 0°55′24″E		1071316	Upload Photo	Q26326424
Barn 5 Yards East of Kemps Corner House	II	Canterbury Road, Kempe's Corner			13 August 1984	TR0329046753; 51°11′02″N 0°54′27″E		1184864	Upload Photo	Q26480175
Barn to East of Boughton Corner Farmhouse	II	Canterbury Road, Boughton Corner			13 August 1984	TR0397347951; 51°11′40″N 0°55′04″E		1071317	Upload Photo	Q26326426
Boughton Corner Farmhouse	II	Canterbury Road, Boughton Corner			27 November 1957	TR0391047945; 51°11′40″N 0°55′01″E		1362708	Upload Photo	Q26644580
Buckwell Farmhouse	II	Canterbury Road			27 November 1957	TR0424848267; 51°11′50″N 0°55′19″E		1362747	Upload Photo	Q26644617
Milestone, 12 Yards South Of The Old Gatehouse	II	Canterbury Road, Kempe's Corner			13 August 1984	TR0328746647; 51°10′58″N 0°54′26″E		1071318	Upload Photo	Q26326428
Old Saddlers Cottage	II	Canterbury Road, Kempe's Corner			13 August 1984	TR0329146714; 51°11′01″N 0°54′27″E		1362710	Upload Photo	Q26644582
Park Barn Farmhouse	II	Canterbury Road			27 November 1957	TR0300646224; 51°10′45″N 0°54′11″E		1071315	Upload Photo	Q26326422
The Old Gatehouse	II	Canterbury Road, Kempe's Corner			13 August 1984	TR0330046656; 51°10′59″N 0°54′27″E		1362709	Upload Photo	Q26644581
Toll Booth Opposite the Old Gatehouse on A28	II	Canterbury Road, Kempe's Corner			13 August 1984	TR0328846657; 51°10′59″N 0°54′26″E		1071319	Upload Photo	Q26326429
Wilmington Farmhouse	II	Canterbury Road			27 November 1957	TR0306045809; 51°10′32″N 0°54′13″E		1071320	Upload Photo	Q26326431
Boughton Court	II*	Church Lane			13 October 1952	TR0328048209; 51°11′49″N 0°54′29″E		1362711	Upload Photo	Q17556900
Church of All Saints	I	Church Lane			27 November 1957	TR0332048144; 51°11′47″N 0°54′31″E		1299904	Church of All Saints More images	Q4729604
Tower Lodge and Flanking Walls, Eastwell Park	II	Eastwell Park, Faversham Road, Goat Lees			27 November 1957	TR0141545930; 51°10′38″N 0°52′49″E		1071321	Tower Lodge and Flanking Walls, Eastwell Park More images	Q26326433
Eastwell Park Kitchen Garden Wall	II	Faversham Road, Boughton Lees			13 August 1984	TR0215847715; 51°11′34″N 0°53′30″E		1184962	Upload Photo	Q26480273
Lodge House, 5 Yards North East of Tower Lodge	II	5 Yards North East Of Tower Lodge, Faversham Road, Goat Lees			13 August 1984	TR0139545942; 51°10′38″N 0°52′48″E		1071322	Lodge House, 5 Yards North East of Tower Lodge More images	Q26326434
Stone House	II	Faversham Road, Goat Lees			13 August 1984	TR0153345651; 51°10′28″N 0°52′54″E		1184938	Upload Photo	Q26480249
The Manor House	II	Faversham Road, Boughton Lees			13 October 1952	TR0207746976; 51°11′11″N 0°53′25″E		1362712	Upload Photo	Q26644583
Tower Farm	II	Faversham Road, Boughton Lees			13 August 1984	TR0207846921; 51°11′09″N 0°53′25″E		1184957	Upload Photo	Q26480267
Kemps Hall	II	Harville Road			13 August 1984	TR0345746718; 51°11′01″N 0°54′35″E		1071327	Upload Photo	Q26326444
Brewhouse	II	Malthouse Lane			13 August 1984	TR0272347717; 51°11′34″N 0°54′00″E		1071328	Upload Photo	Q26326445
Malthouse	II	4 and 5, Malthouse Lane			13 August 1984	TR0274547570; 51°11′29″N 0°54′00″E		1276453	Upload Photo	Q26565965
Soakham Farmhouse	II	North Downs Way, White Hill			9 September 1993	TR0404548934; 51°12′11″N 0°55′10″E		1222200	Upload Photo	Q26516548
Lenacre Hall	II	Sandyhurst Lane, Goat Lees			13 August 1984	TR0120445854; 51°10′35″N 0°52′38″E		1185016	Upload Photo	Q26480324
Bay Tree Cottage	II	The Green, Boughton Lees			13 August 1984	TR0233347294; 51°11′21″N 0°53′39″E		1184982	Upload Photo	Q26480291
Flying Horse Inn	II	The Green, Boughton Lees			27 November 1957	TR0224847318; 51°11′21″N 0°53′34″E		1071323	Flying Horse Inn More images	Q26326436
Forge House	II	The Green, Boughton Lees			13 August 1984	TR0235047264; 51°11′20″N 0°53′39″E		1071325	Upload Photo	Q26326441
Hobday Cottage Pilgrim Cottage	II	The Green, Boughton Lees			13 August 1984	TR0222747163; 51°11′16″N 0°53′33″E		1299870	Upload Photo	Q26587226
Lees Cottage	II	The Green, Boughton Lees			13 August 1984	TR0219347140; 51°11′16″N 0°53′31″E		1071326	Upload Photo	Q26326442
Old Post Office	II	The Green, Boughton Lees			13 August 1984	TR0228547302; 51°11′21″N 0°53′36″E		1071324	Upload Photo	Q26326438
Stables 15 Yards North of the Flying Horse Inn	II	The Green, Boughton Lees			13 August 1984	TR0222647352; 51°11′23″N 0°53′33″E		1184971	Upload Photo	Q26480282
Boughton Aluph and Eastwell War Memorial	II	The Lees, Boughton Lees, TN25 4HX			5 April 2017	TR0215447162; 51°11′17″N 0°53′29″E		1445138	Boughton Aluph and Eastwell War Memorial More images	Q66478694
Mushroom Cottage	II	White Hill, TN25 4HB			13 August 1984	TR0382448539; 51°11′59″N 0°54′58″E		1071329	Upload Photo	Q26326447
Whitehill Cottages	II	Whitehill			13 August 1984	TR0379648641; 51°12′02″N 0°54′57″E		1071292	Upload Photo	Q26326388
Brick Kiln Farmhouse	II	Wye Road, Boughton Lees			13 August 1984	TR0253047156; 51°11′16″N 0°53′48″E		1362735	Upload Photo	Q26644606
Stables 20 Yards South East of Brick Kiln Farmhouse	II	Wye Road, Boughton Lees			13 August 1984	TR0254647130; 51°11′15″N 0°53′49″E		1071293	Upload Photo	Q26326390

== See also ==
- Grade I listed buildings in Kent
- Grade II* listed buildings in Kent

== Sources ==
- Newman, John (2012) [1969], Kent: West and the Weald, The Buildings of England, New Haven and London: Yale University Press, ISBN 978-0-300-18509-6
