= Maurice Bevan =

British singer and composer (1921–2006)

- Born: 10 March 1921
- Died: 20 June 2006 (aged 85)
- Occupations: Singer; composer

Maurice Guy Smallman Bevan (10 March 1921 – 20 June 2006) was a British bass-baritone and composer.

== Early life ==
Bevan was born on 10 March 1921.

== Career ==
Bevan was a bass-baritone and composer, who sang with The Deller Consort (founded by Alfred Deller in 1948), St Paul's Cathedral in London, and the BBC.

== Death ==
Devan died on 20 June 2006.
