= Stour Music Festival =

Annual early-music festival in Stour valley, Kent, England

Coordinates: 51.196344°N 0.908679°E

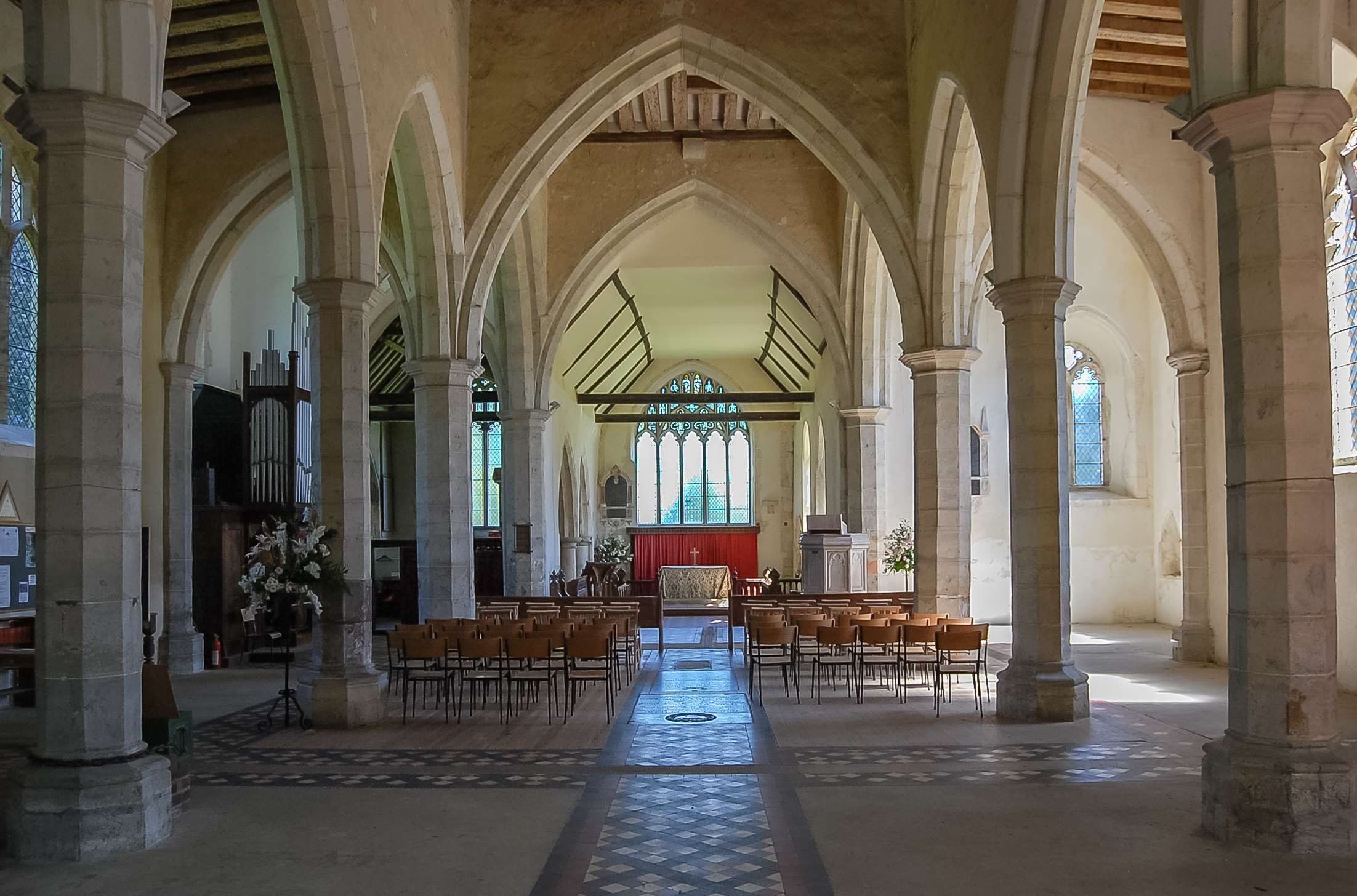
Interior of All Saints' Church

The Stour Music Festival is a festival of early music held in the Stour valley, Kent, England, founded by countertenor Alfred Deller in 1962. The principal venue is a medieval church, All Saints' Church, Boughton Aluph. The building has good acoustics and was used for some of Deller's recordings.

After Deller's death in 1979, his son Mark Deller continued the festival, and celebrated its 50th birthday alongside his father's centenary in 2012. In 2020 Robert Hollingworth, known for his work with I Fagiolini, took over as festival director.

== Visual arts ==
In the initial years the festival exhibited paintings, organized by the painter John Ward.

In 2003 it commissioned a new window for All Saints' Church to replace glass destroyed in the Second World War.
