= Saint Christopher's Church, Boughton Lees =

Church in Kent, England

Coordinates: 51°11′14″N 0°53′26″E

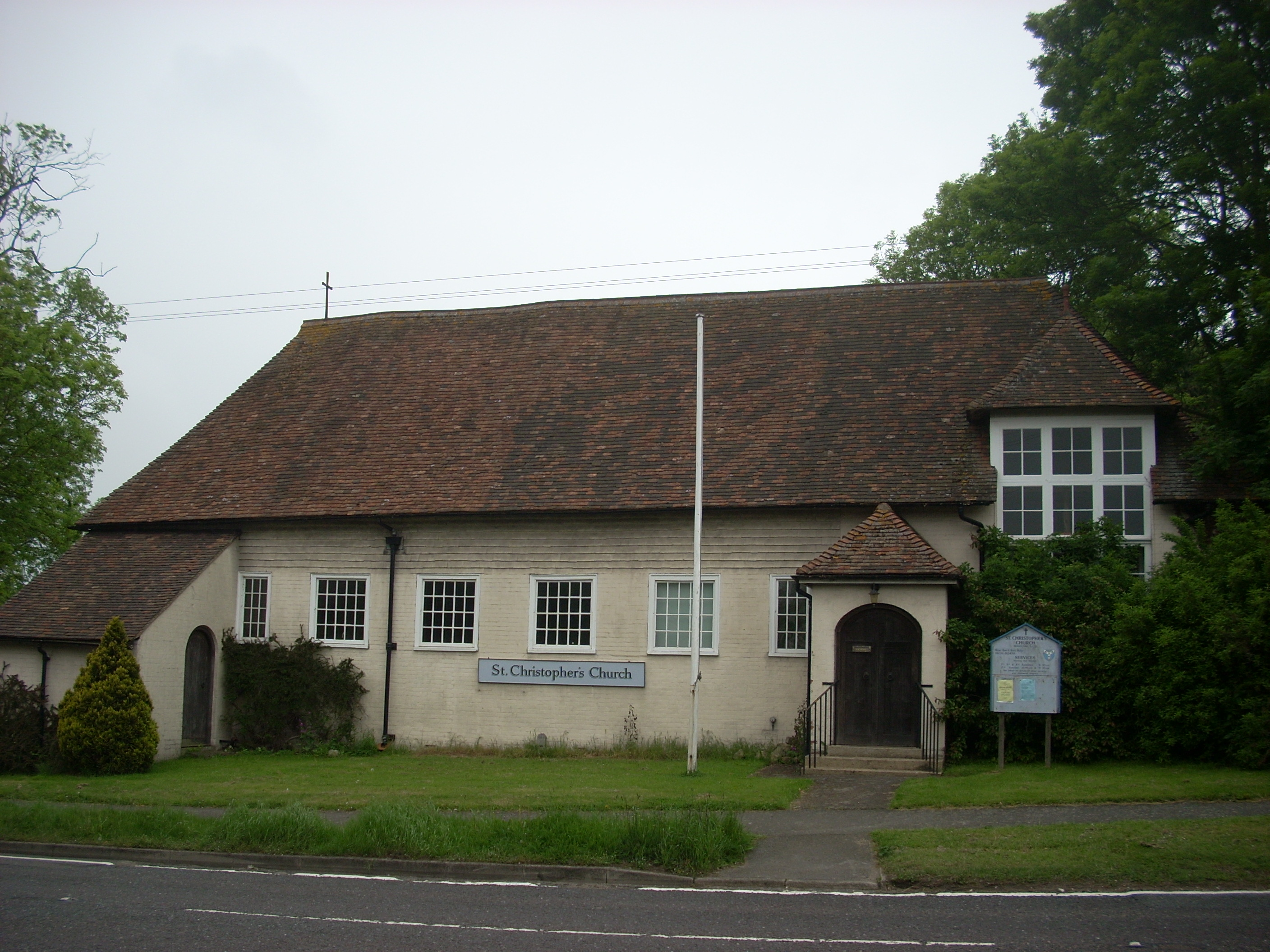
St. Christopher's Church, Boughton Lees

Saint Christopher's Church is a mediaeval Grade II listed church in Boughton Lees near Ashford, Kent, part of the Church of England.

The building was originally a mediaeval hall house. It was later a barn and the village school. In the 1950s, it was adopted as a chapel of ease.

On 13 August 1984, the Church was placed on the Statutory List of Buildings of Special Architectural or Historic Interest, as a Grade II building.

== Worship ==
Saint Christopher's Church is used for Sunday worship outside of the summer months (i.e. October to May). At other times, services are held at All Saints' Church, Boughton Aluph – Saint Christopher's Church is used in the non-summer months as All Saints' does not have any heating.
