= I Will Give my Love an Apple =

Song

"I Will Give my Love an Apple" is a traditional English folk song. It was arranged by Benjamin Britten and by Herbert Howells. The song goes thus:

I will give my love an apple without e'er a core,
I will give my love a house without e'er a door.
I will give my love a palace, wherein she may be
And she may unlock it without e'er a key.

My head is the apple without e'er a core.
My mind is the house without e'er a door.
My heart is the palace, wherein she may be
And she may unlock it without e'er a key.

A version of the song was collected at Sherborne, Dorset, by H. E. D. Hammond in 1906; another version was printed in Journal of the Folk-Song Society, vol. 3, no. 11, 1907, p114.
