= Come Ye Sons of Art =

Ode by Henry Purcell

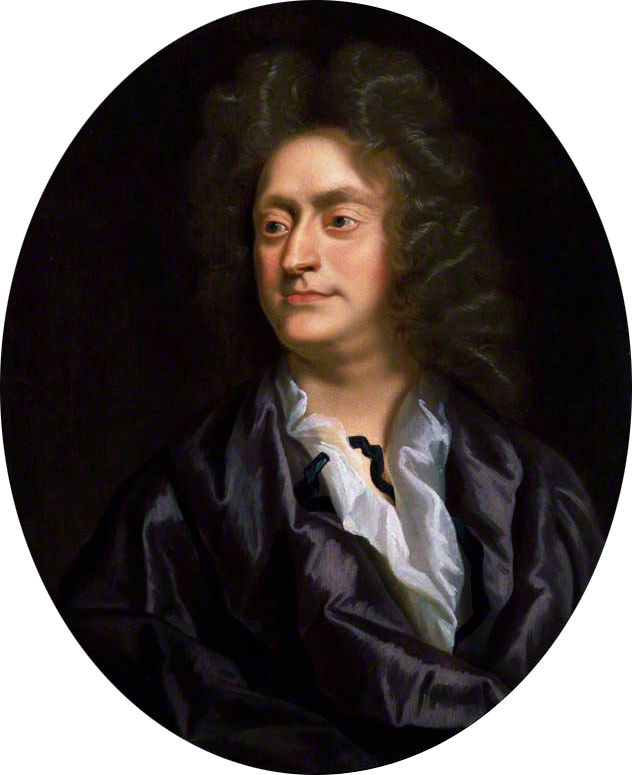
Portrait of Henry Purcell by John Closterman, c. 1695

Come Ye Sons of Art, Z.323, (Note: "Z" is Franklin B. Zimmerman's catalogue of Purcell's works.) also known as Ode for Queen Mary's Birthday, is a musical composition by Henry Purcell. It was written in 1694, and is one of a series of odes in honour of the birthday of Queen Mary II of England. The text of the ode is often attributed to Nahum Tate, who was poet laureate at the time.

== Background and history of the work ==
As a court composer, Purcell was given the task of composing odes for the birthday of Queen Mary. Come, Ye Sons of Art, written for performance in April 1694, was the sixth and final ode: Queen Mary died at the end of that year.

20th-century performances included the inaugural concert of the BBC Third Programme (the forerunner of Radio 3) in 1946.

== Scoring and structure ==
The ode is scored for 2 recorders, 2 oboes, 2 trumpets, timpani, strings, basso continuo and a choir with soprano, alto/countertenor, and bass soloists. It is possible that this instrumentation reflects additions by an 18th-century editor.

1. Sinfonia
2. Ritornello: countertenor solo, and chorus: Come ye Sons of Art
3. Countertenor duet: Sound the trumpet
4. Ritornello and chorus: Come ye Sons of Art
5. Countertenor solo and ritornello: Strike the viol, touch the lute
6. Bass solo and chorus: The day that such a blessing gave
7. Soprano aria: Bid the virtues, bid the graces
8. Bass aria: These are the sacred charms
9. Soprano and bass duet and chorus: See Nature, rejoicing

== Music ==
Purcell begins the ode with a symphony or overture consisting of three movements: a largo followed by a fugal canzona and an adagio. It seems that Purcell later rewrote the opening symphony and incorporated it into his opera The Indian Queen. The opening chorus is on the words "Come, Ye sons of Art," and serves as the introduction to the text. For the countertenor duet Sound the Trumpet, instead of using actual trumpets, Purcell choose to incorporate a two-bar modulating ground bass as the singers imitate the sound of trumpets. The day that such a blessing gave is intended to be a prayer for the day to be of jubilation. This joy is displayed in the rest of the composition.

== Publication ==
One of the numbers, Strike the Viol, was published in Orpheus Britannicus. The rest of the work remained unpublished. "The earliest surviving complete source is a manuscript score signed by one ‘Rob[er]t Pindar’, and dated 1765—some seventy years after Purcell's death."

A new performance edition was published by Stainer & Bell in 2010, edited by Rebecca Herissone. This edition is based on a comparison of Come Ye Sons of Art with manuscripts of other Odes written by Purcell which reveal instrumental and editorial changes made by Pindar. Such comparisons led to the removal of eighteenth-century "enhancement". Dr. Herissone retains the overture, but suggests that Pindar may have incorporated this music from The Indian Queen into Come Ye Sons of Art.

Herissone also points out that the "opening solo quite clearly begins ‘Come, ye sons of arts’, in the plural, not ‘Come, ye sons of art’ as in Pindar's score, so the decision has been taken in the edition to follow the text as given in Purcell's autograph." It appears the original title was 'Come, ye sons of arts.' The full article, along with a complete list of changes made by Pindar, is available in the 2010 publication by Stainer & Bell.

== See also ==
- Music for the Funeral of Queen Mary
- List of compositions by Henry Purcell
