= All Saints' Church, Boughton Aluph =

Coordinates: 51.196338°N 0.908699°E

All Saints Church, Boughton Aluph
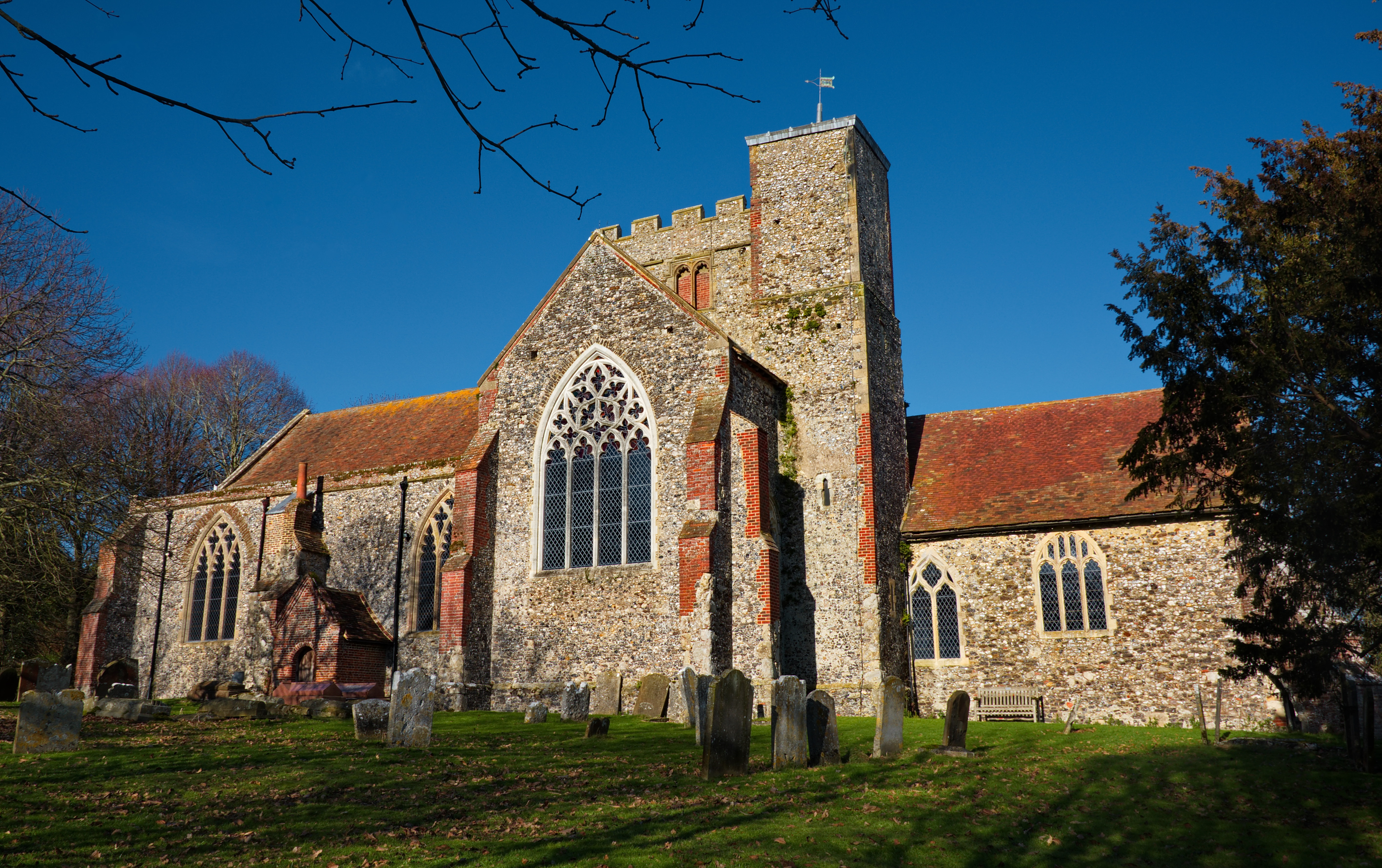
- All Saints Church, Boughton Aluph

- Location within Kent
- OS grid reference: TR 03320 48144
- Location: Boughton Aluph, Kent
- Country: England
- Denomination: Anglican

History
- Status: Parish church
- Founded: 13th century
- Founder: Adulphus

Architecture
- Functional status: Active
- Heritage designation: Grade I
- Designated: 27 November 1957
- Completed: 13th century, 14th-century enlargement

Specifications
- Materials: flint, rubble

Administration
- Province: Canterbury
- Diocese: Canterbury
- Archdeaconry: Canterbury
- Deanery: West Bridge
- Parish: Boughton Aluph and Eastwell

All Saints' Church is a 13th-century pilgrims' Grade I listed church in Boughton Aluph near Ashford, Kent. It is part of the Church of England.

Built in the thirteenth century by a man named Adulphus to replace a Saxon church, it was enlarged in the 14th century by Sir Thomas Aldon, one of Edward III of England's courtiers. The building was restored in 1878. On 27 November 1957, the church was placed on the Statutory List of Buildings of Special Architectural or Historic Interest, as a Grade I building. In the late 1990s and early 2000s, it was extensively renovated, including the cleansing and restoration of the windows in 2009. The church continues to be an active centre for worship, and is part of the United Wye Benefice. Every June, the building is used to host the Stour Music Festival.

== Architecture ==
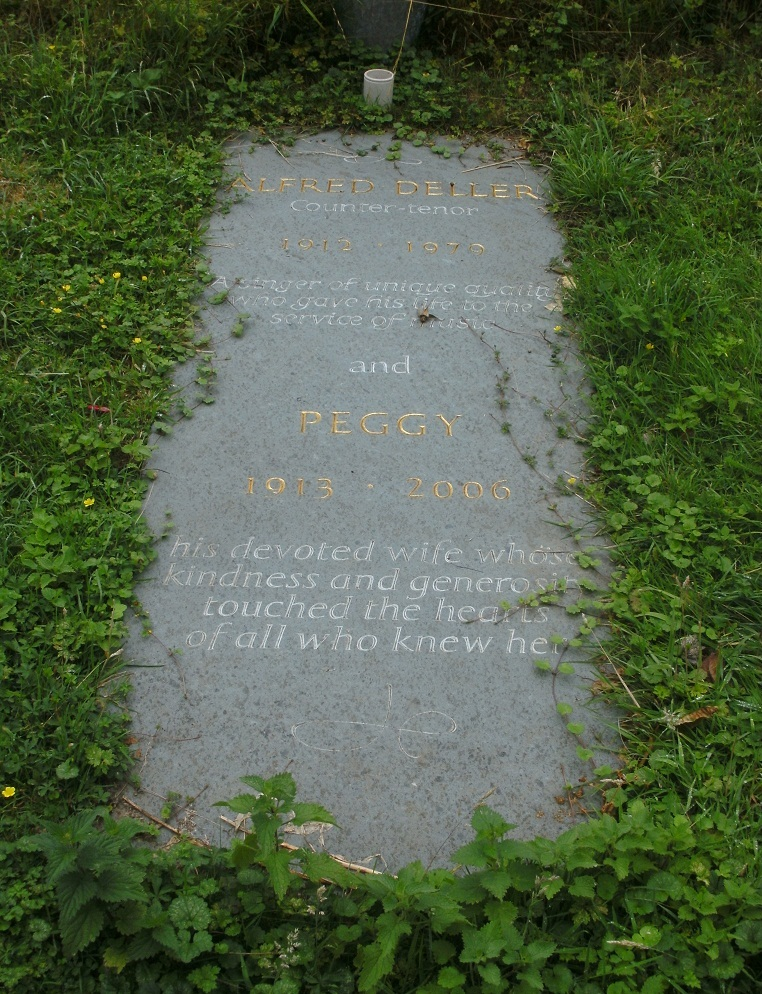
Alfred Deller's grave at All Saints' Church, Boughton Aluph

=== Building history ===
The present chancel and chapel are from the 13th century, with 15th-century east windows and a 17th-century porch. Most of the remainder of the church originates from the 14th century. The nave, aisles, transepts and crossing were all built together, between approximately 1329 and 1361 (based on heraldic evidence).

=== Construction materials ===
The church is primarily built from flint and rubble, with rubble and ashlar dressings. The porch and buttresses are brick constructions.

=== Layout ===
The church consists of a nave, aisles and a chancel. The chapel is in the north-east of the church, a crossing tower with a two-stair turret. There are north and south porches. Both the chancel and the chapel are at a lower level than the transepts and crossing, with steps leading down to the east.

=== Windows ===
The west and north transept windows have a curvilinear design – as did the former south transept window – of four lights with cinquefoil over. The north aisle has two three-light windows in brick while the south aisle has two three-light windows in curvilinearstyle, all in plain chamfered surrounds. In the north chapel, there are two lancets to the west, and two paired lancets with quatrefoils over to east, while the chancel has a three-light Perpendicular window and a two-light curvilinear window on the south wall. The chancel east window is a five-light perpendicular window, while the chapel east window is a four-light perpendicular window. All of the windows possess the original reveals, as do all of the doors. The chancel south wall has two blocked window openings: the westernmost one is blocked by the stair turret while the easterly one is cut through by a 14th-century curvilinear window.

The south transept window is a work of art by Leonie Seliger, commissioned in 2002, which replaced the original windows which was damaged by incendiary bombs in the Second World War. The window had been bricked up and concreted over in 1952. The money to pay for the new window was raised by the Stour Music Festival Appeal Fund in memory of its founder Alfred Deller and to commemorate the 40th anniversary of the founding of the festival.

=== Doors ===
The west door is made of 18th-century plank in a 14th-century roll-moulded surround between two large offset buttresses. The north door is a 17th-century plank with door-width plain metal hinges. The south door has been plastered over.

=== Bays, piers, arches, and reveals ===
The nave has four bays with octagonal piers on moulded bases. The arches are double-chamfered. The crossing piers are a continuation of the nave arcade, although on a slightly larger scale, with crossing arches. All of the piers are made from chalk blocks. Over the west and the north doors, there are angular four-centred arches. The arcade to the chancel has three round piers, various moulded and undercut capitals and 'water-holding' bases. The arches are similar double-chamfered ones as seen in the nave. The same style of arches is also used in the nave, and in the transept crossing arches.

=== Features and fittings ===
- Holy water stoup by north door.
- 13th-century sedile in chancel, with hollow-chamfered and undercut surround. There are attached shafts of uneven height in the door jambs, with drip-mould over the jambs.
- To the east of the church, a piscina with 14th-century leaf crockets over a 13th-century trefoil, with a small plain aumbry over it. There are also piscinas in both the north chapel and the south transept, the latter having an ogee at the top.
- A 15th-century bracket is located above a woman's head in the chancel, while a 15th-century demi-angel leads to a bracket in the chapel.
- In the north transept, the eastern wall has a 15th-century wall painting of the Trinity, with two brackets once supporting a 17th-century monument. This was a dove, representing the Holy Spirit.
- In the north chapel, there is a 14th-century wooden screen, with solid lower panels, and eight-light traceried screens on either side of four-light double door. This is roll moulded with a hollow chamfered beam on top.
- In the chancel are 17th-century altar rails.
- Several windows contain mediaeval glass. Stained glass shields of the King and Kentish families associated with him form part of the east window, along with the Coronation of the Virgin and representations of Edward III and Eleanor.
- The nave contains an octagonal font.
- There are several monuments in the north ("Moyle") chapel:
  - "To Amye Clerk (nee Moyle), d.1631"
  - A marble monument showing a shrouded person lying down, with children at their head and feet. Above this, there is coffered pediment on a corinthian pair of columns in white marble on black.
  - Black tablet on floor to Captain Robert Moyle (died in 1639) – moulded arch surround carved with military trophies. This used to be in the north transept, but was badly damaged when moved to the chapel.
  - On the south pier of the chapel south pier, there is a black and white marble wall tablet dedicated to Sir Robert Moyle (died in 1661) on a console along with scrolls, over which is a pediment (which is broken) containing achievement.
  - On the north wall of the north chapel, there is a 17th-century coat of arms in a heraldic lozenge.
- A fireplace is located in the south porch, originally catering for pilgrims going to the shrine of Thomas Becket in Canterbury Cathedral

== Churchyard ==
The famous countertenor Alfred Deller, CBE (1912–1979) and his wife Peggy (1913–2006) are buried in the newer section of the churchyard. On 31 May 2012, All Saints' Church held a concert to celebrate Deller's 100th birthday during which James Bowman planted a tree in memory of Deller in the churchyard.

== Worship ==
All Saints' Church is used for Sunday worship in the summer months (May to October); at other times, services are held at St Christopher's Church in Boughton Lees, as All Saints' Church has no heating.
