= Willow song =

English folk song

The Willow song is an anonymous Elizabethan or earlier folk song used in the penultimate act of Shakespeare's Othello. The earliest record of the Willow song is in a book of lute music from 1583, while Shakespeare's play was not written until 20 years later in 1604. The song in Shakespeare's play is sung by Desdemona, Othello's wife, when she has begun to fear her jealous husband.

== Selected recordings ==
- Heroines of Love and Loss, Ruby Hughes BIS – BIS2248
- Shakespeare Songs Deller Consort, Alfred Deller with Desmond Dupré (lute) Harmonia Mundi Musique d'Abord – HMA195202
- Songs for Voice and Guitar Wilfred Brown (tenor) John Williams, Sony
- Byrd & Dowland: Ye Sacred Muses Jean-Michel Fumas (countertenor) Eliza Consort Ameson – ACSP1122
- Shakespeare – Come Again Sweet Love Daniel Taylor (countertenor) Theatre of Early Music RCA – 88697727222
- Songs for William Shakespeare Sara Stowe (soprano) The Gift of Music – CCLCDG1006
- Shakespeare's Englande Music of his Plays & People James Griffett (tenor), Brian Wright (lute) English Consort of Viols, Nicholas McGegan Griffin – GCCD4036
- A Distant Mirror The Folger Consort
