= Rebecca Herissone =

Rebecca Louise Herissone FBA FHEA (born 12 June 1971) is Professor of Musicology at the University of Manchester.

== Biography ==
Herissone has a Master of Arts degree from the University of Cambridge, a Master of Music degree from the University of London and a PhD from Cambridge. She held a research fellowship at Emmanuel College, Cambridge from 1995 until 1999 and a lectureship at Lancaster University before joining the University of Manchester as a Senior Lecturer in 2006. She was appointed as a fellow of the British Academy in 2019.

Herissone is a council member of the Royal Musical Association and sits on the editorial board for the journal Music & Letters.
