= Caleno custure me =

Song mentioned in Shakespeare's Henry V

Caleno custure me (also spelled Calin o custure me) is the title of a song mentioned in Shakespeare's Henry V (IV,4). The context is on a Hundred Years' War battlefield, where an English soldier cannot understand his French captive and intending to answer in similar gibberish pronounces the title of the song.

French Soldier
Je pense que vous êtes gentilhomme de bonne qualité.
PISTOL
Qualtitie calmie custure me! Art thou a gentleman?
what is thy name? discuss.
French Soldier
O Seigneur Dieu !

The song as preserved has English lyrics, with this single line of mock-Latin as its Chorus. The origin of the line is not Latin, however, but is most commonly believed to refer to the Irish-language song Cailín Óg a Stór. It has also been claimed to be from the Irish Cailín ó Chois tSiúre mé, 'I am a girl from the Suir-side' from the 17th century Irish poem Mealltar bean le beagán téad.

== See also ==
- Macaronic
