= Desmond Dupré =

British musician (1916–1974)

Desmond John Dupré (19 December 1916, London – 16 August 1974, Tonbridge, Kent) was an English lutenist, guitarist, gambist and a prominent figure in the 20th century revival of early music. He was known particularly for his recordings on lute and viola da gamba, notably with counter-tenor Alfred Deller.

== Early life ==
Desmond Dupré was the third child of Frederick Harold Dupré, an analytical chemist, and Ruth Clarkson, a violinist. Dupré was educated at Merchant Taylors' School, London and studied chemistry at Oxford University in 1936, graduating with a first in chemistry in 1940. He went on to study music at the Royal College of Music from 1946, studying cello with Ivor James and harmony with Herbert Howells. He became interested in the viol, and taught himself this instrument.

== Career ==
His first professional engagements were as a guitarist and as a cellist with the Boyd Neel Orchestra.

He formed a duo with Alfred Deller in 1948. In 1950, His Master's Voice released the first of his many recordings with Deller. In this one he accompanied him on the guitar. Like Deller, Dupré was much interested in a more authentic style of performance. Instead of continuing to play lute repertoire on the guitar, he taught himself the lute, and his subsequent performances with Deller were predominantly on that instrument, including his 1951 Wigmore Hall debut.

He was a regular performer with many leading early music groups, including the Julian Bream Consort, the Jacobean Consort of Viols, and Musica Reservata. He recorded Bach's sonatas for viola da gamba and harpsichord with Thurston Dart, and Dart reconstructed a Handel concerto for lute and harp, which Dupré premiered.

Dupré was the first president of the Lute Society, a post he held from 1956 to 1973.

== Partial discography ==
- Bach – The Three Viola da Gamba Sonatas (L'Oiseau-Lyre LP OLS 157, 1958)
