= Alfred Deller =

English countertenor (1912–1979)

Alfred Deller CBE
- Born: Alfred George Deller; 31 May 1912; Margate, Kent, England
- Died: 16 July 1979 (aged 67); Bologna, Italy
- Resting place: All Saints' Church, Boughton Aluph, Kent, England
- Occupation: Countertenor
- Years active: 1940–1979

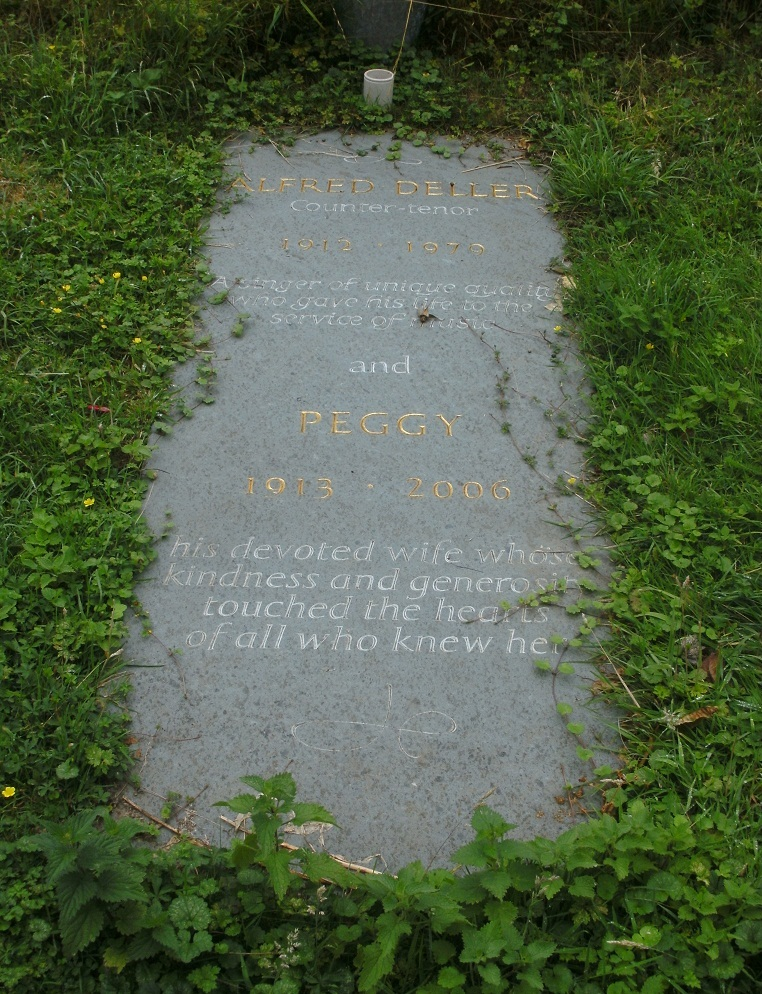
Alfred Deller's grave at All Saints' Church, Boughton Aluph

Alfred George Deller, CBE (31 May 1912 – 16 July 1979), was an English singer and one of the main figures in popularising the return of the countertenor voice in Renaissance and Baroque music during the 20th century.

He is sometimes referred to as the "godfather of the countertenor". His style in singing lute song, with extensive use of rubato and extemporised ornamentation, was seen as radical and controversial in his day but is now considered the norm.

Deller was an influential figure in the renaissance of early music: an early proponent of "original instrument performance" and one of the first to bring this form to the popular consciousness through his broadcasts on the BBC. He also founded the Stour Music Festival in 1962, one of the first and most important early music festivals in the world.

== Life and career ==
=== Church music ===
Deller was born in Margate, a seaside resort in Kent. As a boy, he sang in his local church choir. When his voice broke, he continued singing in his high register, eventually settling as a countertenor. Deller was initially employed as a lay clerk at Canterbury Cathedral from 1940 to 1947, before joining the choir of St Paul's Cathedral (1947–62).

=== Solo career ===
From this choral tradition, Deller emerged as a soloist, largely as a result of the admiration of the composer Michael Tippett, who heard him while at Canterbury and recognised the unique beauty of his voice. Tippett introduced him to the public as a countertenor, rather than a male alto. He also became better known with a radio broadcast of Henry Purcell's Come Ye Sons of Art on the BBC Third Programme when this station was launched in 1946. He concentrated on popularising and recording the music of English Baroque and Renaissance music by composers such as John Dowland and Purcell.

=== Style ===
Throughout the 19th century, it was only in the tradition of all-male cathedral choirs that the countertenor voice had survived. Deller's voice sounded remarkably high. Misconceptions about the countertenor voice were common at the time Deller was first gaining significant notice as a singer, which was only a matter of decades after the last castrato had died; Michael Chance tells the story that once, a French woman, upon hearing Deller sing, exclaimed "Monsieur, vous êtes eunuque"—to which Deller replied, "I think you mean 'unique', Madam."

=== Deller Consort ===
In 1948, Deller formed the Deller Consort, a group dedicated to historically informed performance. The group recorded music from as early as the 13th century and significantly expanded popular notions of the Baroque repertoire, producing high-quality authentic period performances of the works of Bach, Handel, Purcell, Dowland, and even folk songs.

Membership of the Deller Consort changed over the years, particularly the top line (sopranos April Cantelo, Honor Sheppard and Mary Thomas). It included various baritones (especially Maurice Bevan) and tenors (especially Philip Todd and Wilfred Brown). From 1964, Alfred Deller's son Mark was a member. In 1972, the Deller Consort performed for the Peabody Mason Concert series in Boston.

Despite his experience directing the consort, Deller's conducting of chamber orchestras attracted some adverse comment regarding technique.

=== Collaborations ===
In 1960, Deller sang the role of Oberon in the first production of Benjamin Britten's opera A Midsummer Night's Dream. Britten wrote this role with Deller specifically in mind, although he was dropped from staged revivals of the work against the composer's wishes, largely because of poor acting technique. The smallness of his voice was also a negative factor in the casting process at Covent Garden. He did record the opera, with the composer conducting in 1967. The 1960 premiere, broadcast by the BBC, is now commercially available and finds Deller in fresher voice; Myfanwy Piper described his singing of Oberon as "unearthly".

Lutenist Desmond Dupré performed with him, initially as a guitarist; other accompanists included harpsichordist and musicologist Walter Bergmann. In later years, he worked with lutenist Robert Spencer and harpsichordists Harold Lester and William Christie. His recordings include the lute songs of Dowland, operas by Handel, Britten's A Midsummer Night's Dream, songs and semioperas by Purcell (such as The Fairy Queen), traditional English folk songs, works by Thomas Tallis, and the Bach alto repertoire. He recorded for His Master's Voice, Vanguard Classics, and Harmonia Mundi.

Deller also sang John Blow and Henry Purcell Odes like "Sound the trumpet" from Come Ye Sons of Art with the other great counter-tenor of the day, John Whitworth (1921–2013), who is favoured by critic Richard Lawrence for his magnificent voice.

=== Death ===
On 16 July 1979, Deller died after a heart attack suffered whilst working in Bologna in Italy. Deller and his wife are buried in the churchyard of All Saints' Church, Boughton Aluph, Kent.

== Family ==
Deller married Kathleen Margaret ('Peggy') Lowe (1913–2006) in 1937. They had three children; the eldest, Mark Deller, became an accomplished singer in his own right and frequently performed with his father, for example on the 1972 album Folksongs. Another son, Simon, trained as a music teacher during the 1960s and taught at Guildford Cathedral choir school, eventually becoming its headmaster.

== Honours ==
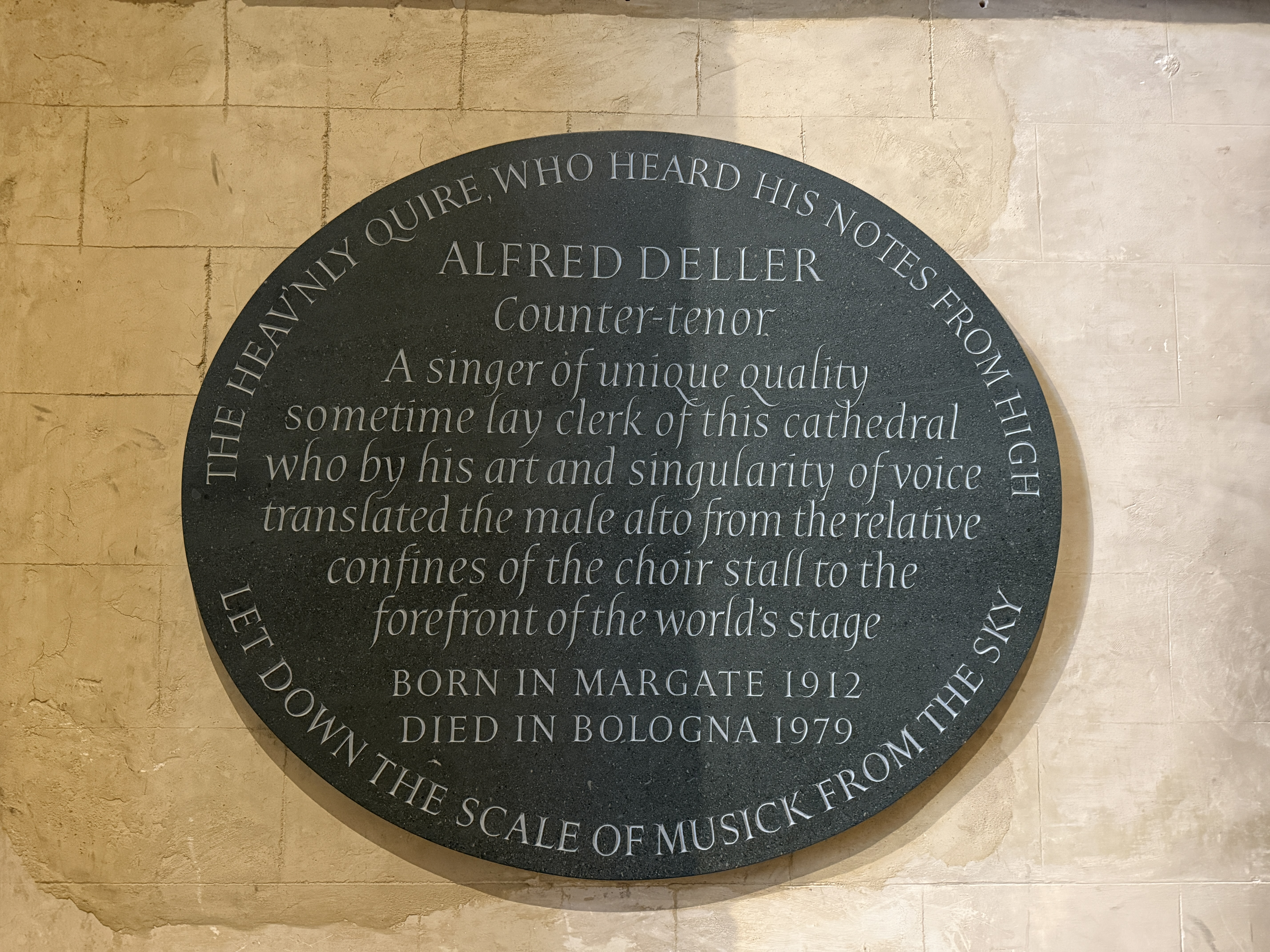
Memorial in Canterbury Cathedral

Deller was appointed Commander of the Order of the British Empire in the 1970 New Year Honours.

In Canterbury Cathedral, a tablet in the south quire aisle commemorates Deller and his work.

On 31 May 2012, All Saints' Church, Boughton Aluph held a concert to celebrate Deller's 100th birthday. There was also an exhibition of paintings and drawings by John Ward, who illustrated many of the early programmes for the music festival. After the concert, the countertenor James Bowman planted a tree in memory of Deller in the churchyard where he is buried.

== Selected discography ==
Deller made at least 136 recordings from 1949 to his death in 1979. His first were for His Master's Voice (1949–1954). Then followed 13 years with Vanguard Records (1954–1967), under the labels The Bach Guild in Europe and Amadeo in the US. Then, following a concert in Avignon in 1967 where Deller met Bernard Coutaz, founder of Harmonia Mundi France, Deller spent his remaining years with the French label.

- Shakespeare Songs 1967
- Folksongs 1972
- John Dowland Lute Songs (with Robert Spencer, lute & The Consort of Six), Harmonia Mundi, 1978, re-released June 2012, hmGold HMG50244.45
