= Alford (surname) =

Alford is a surname. Notable people with the surname include:

- Alan F. Alford (born 1961), British writer on mythology
- Alford Velaphi (born 1999), Motswana footballer
- Andrew Alford (1904–1992), American inventor of antennas for radio navigation systems
- Anthony Alford (born 1994), American baseball player
- Billy Alford (born 1981), American football player
- Brian Alford (born 1975), American football player
- Bruce Alford Jr. (born 1945), American football kicker
- Bruce Alford Sr. (1922–2010), American football end
- Bryce Alford (born 1995), American basketball player
- Carl Alford (born 1972), English professional footballer
- Chalmers Alford (1955–2008), American jazz guitarist
- Charles Alford (1816–1898), Anglican bishop
- Dale Alford (1916–2000), American politician from Arkansas
- Damien Alford (born 2001), Canadian football player
- Darnell Alford (born 1977), American football player
- Dave Alford (born 1958), American drummer
- Dean Alford (born 1953), American businessman and politician from Georgia
- DeAundre Alford (born 1997), American football player
- Dominic Alford (born 1988), American football player
- Edna Alford (born 1947), Canadian author
- Edward Alford (MP for Colchester) (c.1566–c.1632), English landowner and politician
- Edward Alford (Royalist), English landowner and politician
- Enoch Leach Alford (1829–1912), American politician
- Francis Alford (1920–1942), Australian private, killed in the Ration Truck massacre
- Frank Alford (1901–1983), English footballer
- Gene Alford (1905–1972), American football player
- Harry L. Alford (c.1879–1939), American arranger and composer
- Henry Alford (disambiguation), several people, including:

- Henry Alford (theologian) (1810–1871), English churchman and scholar

- Alford's Law, his rule for Biblical interpretation

- Henry Alford, tried for murder 1963, hence Alford plea, American legal term
- Henry Alford (police officer) (1816–1892), South Australian mounted policeman, hotelier
- Henry Alford (writer) (born 1962), American humorist and journalist

- Henry King Alford (1852–1930), mayor of Toowoomba, Queensland
- Jabe B. Alford (1850–1927), American politician
- Jay Alford (born 1983), American football player
- Jeffrey Alford, American-born Canadian food writer
- Jim Alford (1913–2004), Welsh track athlete
- John Alford (disambiguation), multiple people with the name, including:

- John Alford (actor) (1971–2026), Scottish-born English actor
- John Alford (cricketer) (born 1941), English cricketer
- John Alford (died 1691) (1645–1691), MP for Midhurst and Bramber
- John Alford (lutenist) (fl. 16th c.), English lutenist and translator of a treatise on the lute
- John Alford (MP for Hedon) (died 1600), Member of Parliament (MP) for Hedon
- John Alford (Parliamentarian) (c. 1590–1649), MP for New Shoreham in the Long Parliament
- John Alford (priest) (1919–1995), Church of England priest
- John Alford (professor) (1686–1761), established chair at Harvard
- John M. Alford (1915–1988), U.S. Navy admiral
- John R. Alford, American political scientist

- Julius Caesar Alford (1799–1863), American politician
- Kenneth J. Alford (1881–1945), English composer of many marches
- Leon P. Alford (1877–1942), American mechanical engineer
- Lynwood Alford (born 1963), American football player
- M. A. Alford (born 1991), American artist
- Maria Alford (1817–1888), English artist and art patron
- Mario Alford (born 1992), American football player
- Michael Alford (historian) (1587–1652), Jesuit missionary born in London, author of Fides Regia Britannica, 1663
- Michael Alford (athletic director) (born 1969), College athletic director
- Mike Alford (1943–2013), American football player
- Mimi Alford, alleged mistress of John F. Kennedy
- Mitchell Cary Alford (1855–1914), Lieutenant Governor of Kentucky
- Noel Alford (1932–2022), Australian rules footballer
- Paul Alford, Canadian football player of the early 1950s
- Phillip Alford (born 1948), American actor
- Robert Alford (politician) (born 1950), Canadian politician
- Robert Alford (born 1988), American football player
- Roger Alford (died 1580), English landowner and politician
- Sam Alford (born 1986), English rugby union player
- Sidney Alford, English explosives expert
- Stephen Alford (born 1970), British historian
- Steve Alford (born 1942), American politician
- Steve Alford (born 1964), American basketball player and head coach
- Ted Alford (born 1971), Canadian football player
- TJ Alford (born 2006), American football player
- Tony Alford (born 1968), American football player and coach
- T. Alford-Smith (1864–1936), British geographer
- William P. Alford (born 1948), Professor at Harvard Law School
- William VanMeter Alford Jr., American Rear Admiral
- W. R. (Red) Alford (1937–2003), American mathematician
- Xavion Alford, American football defensive back for the Arizona State Sun Devils
- Zack Alford, American drummer

== See also ==
- Allford (disambiguation), includes list of people with surname Allford
