= John Alford =

John Alford may refer to:

== Politicians ==
- John Alford (MP for Hedon) (died 1600), Member of Parliament (MP) for Hedon
- John Alford (Parliamentarian) (c. 1590–1649), MP for New Shoreham in the Long Parliament
- John Alford (died 1691) (1645–1691), MP for Midhurst and Bramber

== Others ==
- John Alford (lutenist) (fl. 16th c.), English lutenist and translator of a treatise on the lute
- John Alford (actor) (1971–2026), British actor
- John Alford (cricketer) (born 1941), English cricketer
- John Alford (professor) (1686–1761), established chair at Harvard
- John M. Alford (1915–1988), U.S. Navy admiral
- John Alford (priest) (1919–1995), Church of England priest
- John R. Alford (fl. 1980s–2020s), American political scientist
- John Alford (1939–2023), member of The Allisons
