= Henry Alford =

Henry Alford may refer to:

- Henry Alford (theologian) (1810–1871), English churchman, theologian, poet and writer

- Alford's Law, his rule for Biblical interpretation

- Henry Alford (police officer) (1816–1892), South Australian mounted policeman, hotelier
- Henry Alford (writer) (born 1962), American humorist
- Henry King Alford (1852–1930), mayor of Toowoomba, Queensland

== See also ==
- Harry L. Alford (1875–1939), American arranger and composer of band marches
- Alford plea, American legal term named for Henry Alford, on trial for murder 1963
