= Alsford =

Alsford is a surname. Notable people with the surname include:

- Julian Alsford (born 1972), English footballer
- Niki Alsford, British academic
- Walter Alsford (1911–1968), English footballer

== See also ==
- Alford (surname)
