= Department of Philosophy (Harvard University) =

School in Cambridge, Massachusetts, US

- Parent institution: Harvard Faculty of Arts and Sciences
- Chairperson: Bernhard Nickel
- Faculty: approx. 25 full-time faculty members (2023)
- Students: approx. 80-100 undergraduate students and 50 Ph.D. students
- Location: Emerson Hall, Cambridge, MA, United States
- Website: philosophy.fas.harvard.edu

The Department of Philosophy is an academic department within the Faculty of Arts and Sciences at Harvard University in Cambridge, Massachusetts, United States.

Housed at Emerson Hall, the department offers bachelor's, master's and doctorate degrees in philosophy. Both undergraduate and graduate students can complete programs with other Harvard departments. Students publish and edit The Harvard Review of Philosophy, an annual peer-reviewed journal on philosophy. The department consistently ranks among the top ten philosophical faculties in the U.S. and the world and specializes in a wide range of topics, including moral and political philosophy, aesthetics, metaphysics, analytical philosophy, history of philosophy, epistemology, and philosophy of science, language, mind, and logic.

Historically, philosophy at Harvard has transitioned from conservative religious traditions to more liberal and progressive schools of thought. Harvard initially trained Puritan clergymen in logic, ethics, and theology. During the early 19th century, Harvard was associated with the development of unitarianism and, correspondingly, transcendentalism, and produced thinkers like Ralph Waldo Emerson and Henry David Thoreau. In the late 19th and early 20th century, the department was an important source of pragmatism of philosophers such as William James, C. I. Lewis, and George Santayana, and Josiah Royce's American idealism. W. E. B. Du Bois and Alain LeRoy Locke followed the tradition of pragmatism and applied philosophy to African-American experiences and culture. Later in the 20th century, philosophy at Harvard saw significant contributions in political philosophy, especially from John Rawls and Robert Nozick. More recently, Harvard philosophy professors such as Willard Van Orman Quine and Hilary Putnam have made notable advances in analytic philosophy.

== History ==
=== 17th and 18th centuries ===
Philosophy teaching at Harvard College in its early years aligned with the theological worldview of Puritanism, as faculty were Puritans and the college trained students become Puritan ministers. Early curriculum focused on classical education with philosophical subjects, including logic, ethics, metaphysics, and theology. Harvard's course of study was modeled after those of Cambridge University and Oxford University, which included strands of mental, moral, and natural philosophy.

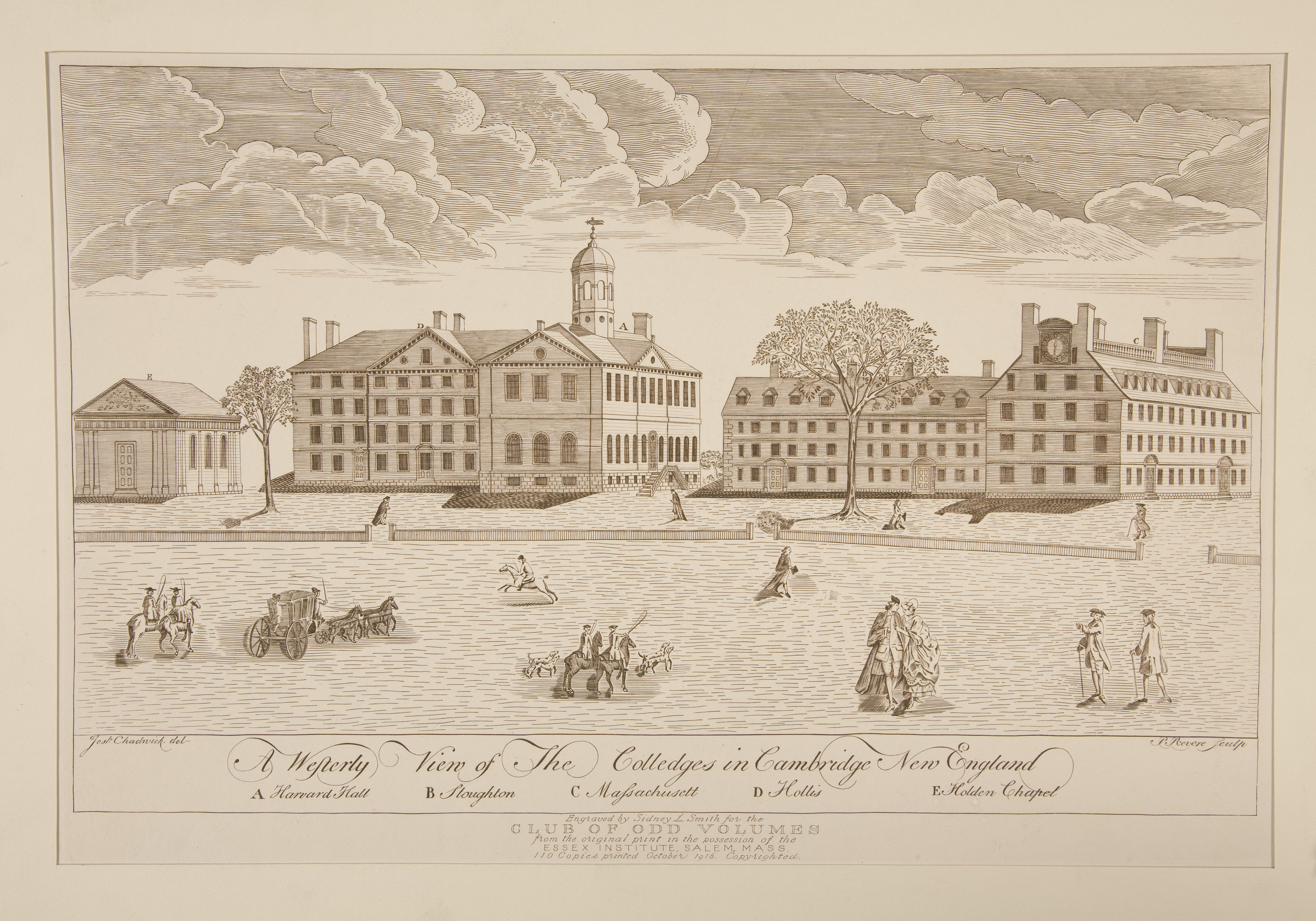
Harvard College, pictured in 1767, was originally an institution of religious training with philosophical instruction focusing on moral philosophy and logic.

Philosophical discourse at Harvard and other New England colleges in the 17th and 18th century centered around religious issues of Puritanism. New England Puritan thought relied heavily on dogma, but attempted to systematically develop a coherent worldview, as well as philosophically grapple with the tensions between the elements of arbitrary and emotional "piety" and rational "intellect." Pupils read works on rhetoric, logic, and philosophy by William Ames, Franco Burgersdijk, Petrus Ramus, Bartholomäus Keckermann, and other religious thinkers.

During the Great Awakenings, moral philosophy at Harvard addressed issues with the development of religious revival movements. According to Norman Fiering, moral philosophical debates at Harvard served as precursors to the parallel discussions during the Great Awakening between Old Lights such as Harvard president Charles Chauncy and New Lights as Jonathan Edwards, in which Harvard adopted both views of intellectualism and voluntarism. Charles Chauncy would oppose sensational experiences of religion that were spread during the Great Awakening and developed a more rationalistic religious movement departing from Puritan orthodoxy.

During the later 18th century, Harvard began to adopt a latitudinarianism and a more liberal, tolerant, rational, and practical form of Christianity. In 1789, Harvard established the Professorship of Natural Religion, Moral Philosophy, and Civil Polity that would attempt to show the coherence of the "doctrines of Revelation" and the "dictates of Reason."

=== 19th century ===
In the 19th century, unitarianism originated in the United States at Harvard after the college appointed the first unitarian professor of divinity in 1805. Following this appointment, the school became dominated by a unitarian moral philosophy that rejected Christ's divinity and departed from the orthodox theology of Puritans in earlier centuries. Transcendentalism followed the developments of unitarianism, emphasizing free conscience and the value of intellectual reason. Notable transcendentalist philosophers, who graduated from Harvard, included Ralph Waldo Emerson and Henry David Thoreau.

In the early decades of the 19th century, Harvard College offered philosophy courses in the areas of 1. intellectual philosophy 2. moral and political philosophy 3. religion and natural theology 4. logic and 5. natural philosophy. Core texts that were part of the curriculum included works by English and Scottish philosophers and theologians, including John Locke, Thomas Brown, William Paley, William Enfield, Dugald Stewart, William Smellie, Joseph Butler, among others. The philosophy curriculum at Harvard during this time was dominated by Scottish common sense realism and the empiricism of John Locke. At the same time, the college attempted to maintain philosophical and religious orthodoxy and likewise required professors to declare allegiance to the Protestant Reformed Christian faith.

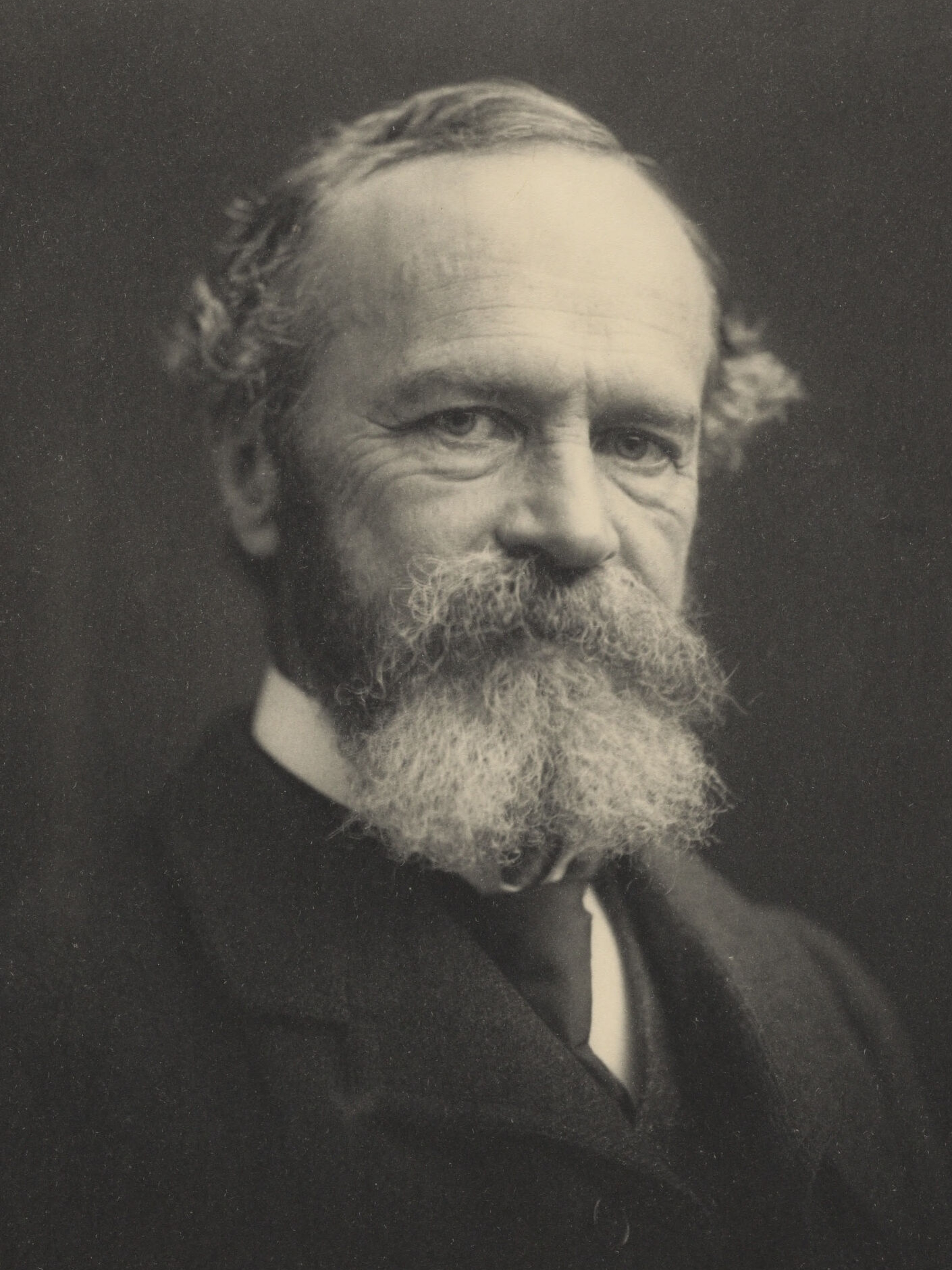
William James, founder of pragmatism and American psychology, is condsidered one of the most influential American philosophers.

During the second half of the 19th century, Harvard philosophy became a significant center for the development of the American philosophy of pragmatism and American idealism with influential Harvard philosophers such as William James, Alfred North Whitehead, Josiah Royce and later C. I. Lewis. William James, considered the founder of philosophical thought of pragmatism, radical empiricism, and functional psychology, was influential in the foundation of Harvard's Psychology Department, which was initially closely tied with the Philosophy Department. Josiah Royce, considered the father of American idealism, opposed the pragmatism of William James and was a staunch advocate of absolute idealism but would later reformulate his metaphysics as "absolute pragmatism."

W. E. B. Du Bois studied at Harvard College from 1888 to 1890, where he was strongly influenced by Professor William James and would later make significant developments in the connection of philosophy and race.

Charles Sanders Peirce, a close friend of William James and key philosopher of pragmatism, studied natural history and philosophy at Harvard but was multiple times denied a professorship at the university due to undistinguished grades and disapproval by Harvard President Charles William Eliot.

Harvard established a Graduate Department, modeled after the German university system, in 1872, which offered degrees in Master of Arts and Doctor of Philosophy. Philosophy was one of the first three subjects (besides mathematics and history) offered as a Ph.D. by the Graduate Department.

In 1895, the Philosophy Department wrote Harvard Corporation that it had allowed Mary Whiton Calkins to complete all the requirements for the Ph.D. and noted that her "scholarly intelligence was exceptionally high, when compared with that of nearly all other candidates hitherto examined," but Harvard refused to grant her the degree, since she was a woman.

=== 20th century to the present ===
Emerson Hall, which still houses the Philosophy Department, was built in 1905 and named after alumnus Ralph Waldo Emerson. On the official opening, the American Philosophical and American Psychological Associations held meetings at the hall with addresses by President Charles Eliot and Edward Waldo Emerson, Ralph Waldo Emerson's son.

Alain LeRoy Locke completed a bachelor's in philosophy and literature at Harvard College in 1907. He is noted for his contributions to philosophical pragmatism and was central to the Harlem Renaissance.

One of William James's most notable students was George Santayana. Both were naturalists, but they differed in their interpretation of religion. James viewed it as part of individual experiences that were attainable within a supernatural realm but not accessible through science, while Santayana emphasized the mind's creative imagination and held a version of metaphysical naturalism that was influenced by evolutionary Darwinism and maintained that nothing supernatural exists.

== Academics ==
=== Undergraduate studies ===
Philosophy undergraduate students can concentrate in philosophy and receive an A. B. Degree. Undergraduates may also complete degrees through the Mind Brain Behavior Interfaculty Initiative (MBB). The department offers joint-degree programs with the departments of Classics, Government, History, Mathematics, and Religion.

The undergraduate study consists of standard courses on:

- Logic
- Contemporary metaphysics, epistemology, philosophy of science & mind.
- Philosophy of language, ethics, political philosophy, aesthetics.
- History of ancient, medieval, or modern pre-20th-century philosophy.

=== Graduate studies ===
The graduate program is mainly for Ph.D. recipients, as students can only complete A. M. degrees in pursuit of a Ph.D. Graduate students are required to take courses in:

- contemporary theoretical philosophy
- practical philosophy
- history of philosophy

The department offers courses in ancient Greek and Roman, medieval philosophy, early modern European philosophy, and other world philosophical traditions within these critical areas.

Ph.D. programs include standard philosophy, classical philosophy in conjunction with the Harvard Department of Classics, Indian philosophy with the Harvard Department of South Asian Studies, and philosophy and law with the Harvard Law School.

=== Research and publications ===
The Philosophy Department is associated with The Edmond & Lily Safra Center for Ethics which fosters research and teaching on ethical issues.

Harvard University and MIT hold the annual Harvard-MIT Graduate Philosophy Conference to discuss various topics on philosophy, which alternates locations between the two institutions.

The peer-reviewed journal The Harvard Review of Philosophy is published and edited by Harvard philosophy students.

== Rankings ==
According to the QS World University Rankings for Philosophy, Harvard University ranked 9th in 2020, 8th in 2021 and 2022, and 7th in 2023.

Based on a reputation survey from the Philosophical Gourmet Report, Harvard ranked 7th in 2006, 6th in 2009 and 2014, 5th in 2011, and 9th in 2017 among United States graduate faculties. Among philosophical departments in the English-speaking world, Harvard ranked 9th place in another 2021 Philosophical Gourmet Report. Harvard faculty have criticized the Philosophical Gourmet Report for insufficiently high academic standards and failing to meet "social scientific standards."

== Notable people ==
=== Alumni ===
- Ned Block
- Mary Whiton Calkins
- Roderick Chisholm
- Donald Davidson
- Daniel Dennett
- Hubert Dreyfus
- W. E. B. Du Bois
- Ronald Dworkin
- T. S. Eliot
- Ralph Waldo Emerson
- Juliet Floyd
- William Frankena
- Learned Hand
- Charles Hartshorne
- Oliver Wendell Holmes Jr.
- Walter Kaufmann
- Saul Kripke
- David Lewis
- Walter Lippmann
- Alain LeRoy Locke
- Arthur Oncken Lovejoy
- George Herbert Mead
- Thomas Nagel
- Martha Nussbaum
- Onora O'Neill
- Henry David Thoreau
- Matt Yglesias

=== Faculty ===
- William Ernest Hocking
- William James
- Christine Korsgaard
- C.I. Lewis
- Robert Nozick
- G. E. L. Owen
- Ralph Barton Perry
- Robert E. Park
- Hilary Putnam
- Willard Van Orman Quine
- John Rawls
- Josiah Royce
- George Santayana
- Amartya Sen
- T. M. Scanlon
- W. Hugh Woodin

Faculty who have been or are affiliated with the department include Danielle Allen, Thomas Kuhn, Hugo Münsterberg, Martha Nussbaum, Michael Sandel, and Cornel West.

=== Named professorships ===
- Alford Professor of Natural Religion, Moral Philosophy, and Civil Polity: Levi Frisbie (1817-1822), Levi Hedge (1827–1830), James Walker (1838–1853), Francis Bowen (1853–1889), George Herbert Palmer (1889 - 1913), Josiah Royce (1914–1916), William Ernest Hocking (1919–1943), Raphael Demos (1945–1962), Roderick Firth (1962–1987), Thomas M. Scanlon (1984–2016), Selim Berker (2018–present)
- Arthur Kingsley Porter Research Professor of Philosophy: Christine M. Korsgaard (c. 1991–2020)
- Brian D. Young Professor of Philosophy: Richard Moran (c. 1995–present)
- Edgar Pierce Professor of Philosophy: C. I. Lewis (1948–1953), Willard Van Orman Quine (1956–1978), Burton Dreben (1981–1991), Charles Parsons (1991–2005), Susanna Siegel (2011–present)
- Norman E. Vuilleumier Professor of Philosophy: Edward J. Hall
- Samuel H. Wolcott Professor of Philosophy: Alison Simmons (2008–present)
- Teresa G. and Ferdinand F. Martignetti Professor of Philosophy: Sean Kelly (2014–present)

== See also ==
- American philosophy
- List of American philosophers
