= Alfold (disambiguation) =

Alfold is the name of an English village in Surrey.

- Alfold Crossways, nearby

Alföld is also the name of the Hungarian parts of the Pannonian Plain:

- Great Alföld (also known as Alföld or the Great Hungarian Plain)
- Little Alföld (also known as the Little Hungarian Plain)

== See also ==
- Alford (disambiguation)
