= Would It Kill You to Stop Doing That? =

- First edition cover
- Author: Henry Alford
- Publisher: Grand Central Publishing
- Publication date: January 3, 2012
- ISBN: 9780446557665

Would It Kill You To Stop Doing That? is a 2012 non-fiction book by the American humorist Henry Alford that details manners from around the world.

After being interested in a quote by Edmund Burke about how important manners are, Alford traveled around the world researching manners. He also interviews people such as etiquette authority Judith Martin.

== Reception ==
Jincy Willet of The New York Times said that the book "amuses as much as it informs". Sarah Halzack of The Washington Post called the book "a bit haphazard" although "his self-effacing tone and dry sense of humor help to unify the pieces". Philip Marchand of National Post said that "sometimes his humour is a bit strained" although his advice can be "very practical".
