= Thomas Brown (philosopher) =

Scottish physician, philosopher, and poet (1778-1820)

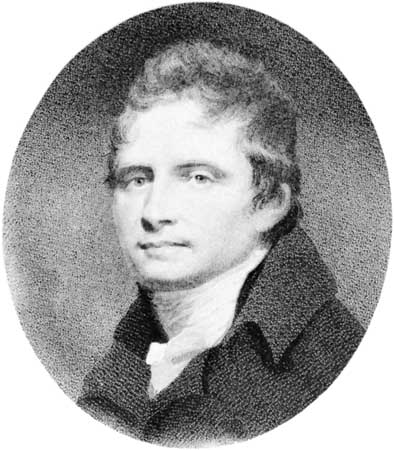
- Born: 9 January 1778; Kirkmabreck, Kirkcudbrightshire, Scotland
- Died: 2 April 1820 (aged 42); Brompton, London, England
- Education: The University of Edinburgh
- Occupations: Philosopher, poet
- Organization: The University of Edinburgh

Thomas Brown FRSE (9 January 1778 – 2 April 1820) was a Scottish physician, philosopher, and poet. Renowned as a physician for his structured thinking, diagnostic skills, and prodigious memory, Brown went on to hold the Chair of Moral Philosophy at Edinburgh University from 1810 to 1820; where, "rather than pronouncing how he found things to be, [Brown] taught [his students] how to go about thinking about things."

== Biography ==
=== Early life ===
Brown was born at Kirkmabreck, Kirkcudbrightshire, the son of Rev. Samuel Brown (died 1779) (minister of Kirkmabreck and Kirkdale) and Mary Smith.

Their son was a wide reader and an eager student. Educated at several schools in London, he went to the University of Edinburgh in 1792, where he attended Dugald Stewart's moral philosophy class, but does not appear to have completed his course. After studying law for a time he took up medicine; his graduation thesis De Somno was well received. But his strength lay in metaphysical analysis.

=== Career ===
Brown set an answer to the objections raised against the appointment of Sir John Leslie to the mathematical professorship (1805). Leslie, a follower of David Hume, was attacked by the clerical party as a sceptic and an infidel, and Brown took the opportunity to defend Hume's doctrine of causality as in no way inimical to religion. His defence, at first only a pamphlet, became in its third edition a lengthy treatise entitled Inquiry into the Relation of Cause and Effect, and is a fine specimen of Brown's analytical faculty.

In 1806, Brown became a medical practitioner in partnership with James Gregory (1753–1821), but, though successful, preferred literature and philosophy. After twice failing to gain a professorship in the university, he was invited, during an illness of Dugald Stewart in the session of 1808–1809, to act as his substitute, and during the following session he undertook much of Stewart's work. The students received him with enthusiasm, due partly to his splendid rhetoric and partly to the novelty and ingenuity of his views. In 1810 he was appointed as colleague to Stewart, a position which he held for the rest of his life. Brown was elected a member of the American Antiquarian Society in 1815. He wrote his lectures at high pressure, and devoted much time to the editing and publication of the numerous poems which he had written at various times during his life. He was also preparing an abstract of his lectures as a handbook for his class. His health, never strong, gave way under the strain of his work.

He was advised to take a trip to London, where he died in 1820 aged 42. His body was returned to Kirkmabreck for burial.

=== Criticism of Erasmus Darwin ===
One of Brown's notable works included a critique of Erasmus Darwin's theory of transmutation. The philosopher published it in the form of a detailed study Observations on the zoonomia of Erasmus Darwin (1798), which was recognized as a mature work of criticism.

There, Brown wrote:

As the earth, to a considerable depth, abounds with the recrements of organic life, Dr. Darwin adopts the opinion, that it has been generated, rather than created; the original quantity of matter having been continually increased, by the processes of animalization, and vegetation. This production of the causes of effects he considers, as affording a more magnificent idea of the infinite power of the Creator, than if he had simply caused the effects themselves; and, if the inconceivable be the source of the magnificent, the opinion is just. It is contrary, however, to all the observations, which prove the processes of animal, and vegetable growth, to be the result of new combinations of matter, previously existing; and it is also in direct opposition to the opinions, which Dr. Darwin has himself advanced.
A body can increase in bulk, only by the farther separation of its parts, in expansion, or by the accretion of new parts. In the former case, no addition is made to the original quantity of matter; and it will surely be admitted, that nothing can accresce, which does not exist. The parts accreted, existing before their junction with the animal, must have formed a portion of the original matter of the world, or been called into being, in a new creation, not by the animal, to which they accresce, but by the great fource of animal existence.
The immense beds of limestone, chalk, and marble, may have been, at one time, the shells of fish, and may thus have received a difference of form; but, unless the calcareous earth, of which they are composed, if that earth be a simple body, or its ingredients, if it be compound, had previously existed, all the powers of animation which the ocean contains would have been insufficient to create a single shell...
The process of generation is said to consist in the secretion by the male of a living filament, and by the female of a nutritive fluid, which stimulates the filament, to absorb particles, and thus to add to its bulk: At the earliest period of its existence the embryon, as secreted from the blood of the male, would seem to consist of a living filament, with certain capabilities of irritation, sensation, volition and association," p. 484. To say, that the filament is living, and that it possesses these powers, is to say, that it possess sensorial power, which is considered by Dr. Darwin, as the source of animation...
Dr. Darwin seems to consider the animals of former times, as possessing powers, much superior to those of their posterity. They reasoned on their wants: they wished: and it was done. The boar, which originally differed little from the other beasts of the forest, first obtained tusks, because he conceived them to be useful weapons, and then, by another process of reasoning, a thick shield-like shoulder, to defend himself from the tusks of his fellows. The stag, in like manner, formed to himself horns, at once sharp, and branched, for the different purposes of offence, and defence. Some animals obtained wings, others fins, and others swiftness of foot; while the vegetables exerted themselves, in inventing various modes of concealing, and defending their feeds, and honey. These are a few of many instances, adduced by Dr. Darwin, which are all objectionable, on his own principles; as they require us to believe the various propensities, to have been the cause, rather than the effect, of the difference of configuration...
If we admit the supposed capacity of producing organs, by the mere feeling of a want, man must have been greatly degenerated, or been originally inferior, in power. He may wish for wings, as the other bipeds are supposed to have done with success; but a century of wishes will not render him abler to take flight. It is not, however, to man that the observation must be confined. No improvements of form have been observed, in the other animals, since the first dawnings of zoology; and we must, therefore, believe them, to have lost the power of production, rather than to have attained all the objects of their desire.

— Thomas Brown, Observations on the Zoonomia of Erasmus Darwin, M.D., Edinburgh, 1798, pp. 432–3, 464–7.

Noteworthy, Brown's criticism of the Darwinian thesis, like that of Rudolf Virchow, did not come from any religious feeling. In fact, Brown's critique bears an uncanny resemblance to Thomas Robert Malthus's Essay on the Principle of Population (1798) in which Malthus's main objection against Darwin's thesis, like that of Brown, was epistemological rather than religious.

=== Reception ===
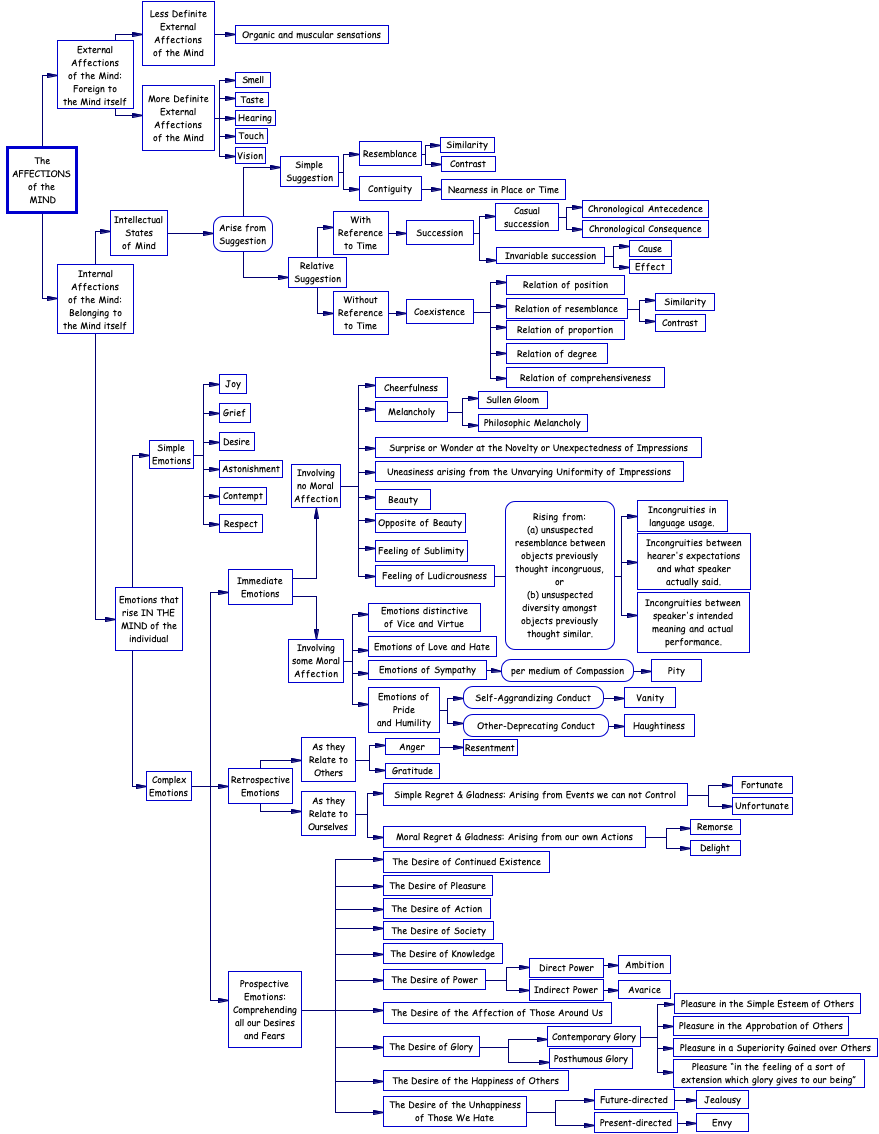
Brown's "Affections of the Mind", as discussed in his Lectures on the Philosophy of the Human Mind.

According to Mike Dacey (2015, p. 35), "Brown’s unique philosophy results from his historical place at the intersection of the associationists and the Scottish school": and, "characteristic of the Scottish school, Brown refuse[d] to speculate on physical or physiological correlates to psychological phenomena":

"Two of [Brown's] ideas stand out as particularly important in later formulations of associationism. He first proposed secondary laws of association, which determine which specific feeling will follow in any particular case. He also introduced the idea that the latter of two successive feelings need not replace the former, but the former could continue in a virtual coexistence with it. He calls it 'virtual' because, in his view, the mind can only be in one state at a time and mental states do not have parts, so there cannot literally be two ideas in mind at once. Virtual coexistence brings complex ideas together without 'connecting' them as literal parts of a whole. A new complex idea is formed when a suggesting idea remains, virtually, to coexist with the idea suggested. — Mike Dacey (2015, p. 35).

Later criticism of Brown's philosophy lessened its popularity, a severe attack being made by Sir William Hamilton, 9th Baronet in his Discussions and Lectures on Metaphysics. A high estimate of his merits was shown in John Stuart Mill's Examination of Hamilton. Also, in David Welsh's Account of the Life and Writings (1825) and James McCosh's Scottish Philosophy (1874). Friedrich Eduard Beneke, who found in him anticipations of some of his own doctrines.

The philosopher Schopenhauer wrote of him in 1844:

Quite recently Thomas Brown has taught ... in his extremely tedious book Inquiry into the Relation of Cause and Effect (4th ed., 1835), ... that knowledge springs from an innate, intuitive, and instinctive conviction; he is therefore essentially on the right path. However, the crass ignorance is unpardonable by which, in this book of 476 pages, 130 of which are devoted to the refutation of Hume, no mention at all is made of Kant, who cleared up the matter seventy years ago. The World as Will and Representation, Vol. II, Chapter IV

In his On the Fourfold Root of the Principle of Sufficient Reason, § 20, Schopenhauer claimed that Brown intended to provide support for the Cosmological Proof of God's Existence. "… sometimes there is an intention…a theological design flirting with the Cosmological Proof…. We find the clearest instance of this in Thomas Browne's [sic] book, On the Relation of Cause and Effect…this Englishman rightly recognizes, that the causal law has invariably to do with changes, and that every effect is accordingly a change. Yet…he is unwilling to admit that every cause is likewise a change and that the whole process is therefore nothing but the uninterrupted connection of changes succeeding one another in time. On the contrary, he persists in clumsily calling the cause an object or substance, which precedes the change…in order that his definition may on no account stand in the way of the Cosmological Proof…."

His friend and biographer, David Welsh (1793–1845), superintended the publication of Brown's text-book, the Physiology of the Human Mind, and his Lectures on the Philosophy of the Human Mind, which was published by his successors, John Stewart and Edward Milroy. The Lectures were well received both in England (where it reached a 19th edition) and in the USA.

Among Brown's poems, which were influenced by Alexander Pope and Akenside were: Paradise of Coquettes (1814); Wanderer in Norway (1815); War-Fiend (1816); Bower of Spring (1817); Agnes (1818); Emily (1819); a collected edition in 4 vols. appeared in 1820. According to Cousin (1910, p. 50), his poetry, although "graceful", "lacked force", "and is now [viz., 1910] forgotten".

Brown was one of the first contributors to the Edinburgh Review. In its second number, he published a criticism of Immanuel Kant's philosophy, based on Charles de Villers's account of it.

== See also ==
- Associationism – Psychological concept
- Hypotheses non fingo – Phrase appearing in a 1713 essay by Isaac Newton
- James Braid (surgeon) – Scottish surgeon (1795–1860), pioneer of hypnotism

== References and further reading ==
=== Thomas Brown ===
- Brown, Thomas (1798), Observations on the Zoonomia of Erasmus Darwin, M.D., Edinburgh: Mundell & Son.
- (Brown, Thomas) (1803a), "Viller's Philosophy of Kant", Edinburgh Review, Vol.1, No.2, (January 1803), pp. 253–280.
- (Brown, Thomas) (1803b), "Belsham's Philosophy of the Mind", Edinburgh Review, Vol.1, No.2, (January 1803), pp. 475–485.
- (Brown, Thomas) (1803c), "Lettre de Charles Villers à Georges Cuvier, de l'Institut National de France, & c. A Letter from Charles Villers to Georges Cuvier, Member of the National Institute of France, on a New Theory of the Brain, as the immediate Organ of the Intellectual and Moral Faculties; by Dr. Gall of Vienna. Metz. 1802", Edinburgh Review, Vol.2, No.3, (April 1803), pp. 147–160.
- Brown, Thomas (1804a), Poems by Thomas Brown, M.D. in Two Volumes: Volume I, Edinburgh: Mundell & Son.
- Brown, Thomas (1804b), Poems by Thomas Brown, M.D. in Two Volumes: Volume II, Edinburgh: Mundell & Son.
- Brown, Thomas (1806). Observations on the Nature and Tendency of the Doctrine of Mr. Hume concerning the Relation of Cause and Effect (Second Edition). Edinburgh: Archibald Constable & Company (via Internet Archive).
- Brown, Thomas (1808), The Renovation of India, A Poem; with The Prophecy of Ganges, an Ode, Edinburgh: Mundell & Son.
- Brown, Thomas (1816a), The Wanderer in Norway, with Other Poems, London: J. Murray.
- Brown, Thomas (1816b), The War-Fiend, with Other Poems (Second Edition), London: J. Murray.
- Brown, Thomas (1817a), The Bower of Spring, with Other Poems, Edinburgh: Archibald Constable and Co.
- Brown, Thomas (1817b), The Paradise of Coquettes: A Poem (Second Edition), Edinburgh: Archibald Constable and Co.
- Brown, Thomas (1818a), Agnes, A Poem: in Four Parts, Edinburgh: Archibald Constable and Co.
- Brown, Thomas (1818b). Inquiry into the Relation of Cause and Effect (Third Edition). Edinburgh: Mundell & Son (via Internet Archive) (published 1818).
- Brown, Thomas (1819), Emily, with Other Poems, Edinburgh: Archibald Constable and Co.
- Brown, Thomas (1820a), Sketch of a System of the Philosophy of the Human Mind, Part First: Comprehending the Physiology of the Mind, Edinburgh: Bell & Bradfute.
- Brown, Thomas (1820b), The Poetical Works of the late Thomas Brown, M.D. Professor of Moral Philosophy in the University of Edinburgh: Vol.I: containing, The Paradise of Coquettes, Edinburgh: W. and C. Tait.
- Brown, Thomas (1820c), The Poetical Works of the late Thomas Brown, M.D. Professor of Moral Philosophy in the University of Edinburgh: Vol.II: containing, I. The Renovation of India, II. The Wanderer in Norway, &c., Edinburgh: W. and C. Tait.
- Brown, Thomas (1820d), The Poetical Works of the late Thomas Brown, M.D. Professor of Moral Philosophy in the University of Edinburgh: Vol.III: containing, I. The Bower of Spring, II. The War-Fiend, &c., Edinburgh: W. and C. Tait.
- Brown, Thomas (1820e), The Poetical Works of the late Thomas Brown, M.D. Professor of Moral Philosophy in the University of Edinburgh: Vol.IV: containing, I. Agnes, II. Emily, with Other Poems, Edinburgh: W. and C. Tait.
- Brown, Thomas (1851). Lectures on the Philosophy of the Human Mind (Nineteenth Edition). Edinburgh: Adam and Charles Black ( via Internet Archive).

=== Others ===
- Blakey, Robert (1836), "Dr. Thomas Brown: Lectures on the Philosophy of the Human Mind", pp. 239–250 in Robert Blakey, History of Moral Science, in Two Volumes: Vol.II (Second Edition), Edinburgh: Bell & Bradfute.
- Blakey, Robert (1850), "Dr. Thomas Brown", pp. 25–33 in Robert Blakey, R., History of the Philosophy of Mind: Embracing the Opinions of all Writers on Mental Science from the Earliest Period to the Present Time; Volume IV: From the Commencement of the Nineteenth Century to the Present Day, London: Longman, Brown, Green and Longmans.
- Boyle, James Parkinson (1849), Compendium of Dr. Brown's Philosophy of the Human Mind, by James Parkinson Boyle, Resident Master, (Trinity College, Dublin), in Two Parts, containing the substance of the two first Vols., chiefly intended for the use of the students of the university (New edition, containing the Sketch of the Physiology of the Mind, unabridged), Dublin: Thomas Connolly.
- Chisholm, Hugh (ed.) (1911). "Brown, Thomas", p. 662, Encyclopædia Britannica, Vol.4 (11th ed.), Cambridge University Press.
- Cousin, John William (1910), A Short Biographical Dictionary of English Literature, London: J.M. Dent & Sons – Short Biographical Dictionary of English Literature (via Wikisource).
- Dacey, Mike (2015). "Associationism without associative links: Thomas Brown and the associationist project". Studies in History and Philosophy of Science Part A. 54: 31–40. Bibcode:2015SHPSA..54...31D. doi:10.1016/j.shpsa.2015.08.001. PMID 26568084.
- Dixon, Thomas (2003), "Introduction", pp.v-xlvi in Thomas Dixon (ed.), The Life and Collected Works of Thomas Brown (1778-1820): Volume One, Thoemmes Press, (Bristol) 2003. ISBN 1855069245
- Gilman Samuel (1856), "Estimate of the Philosophical Writings of Dr. Thomas Brown, Including some remarks on Mental Philosophy", pp. 348–444 in Samuel Gilman, Contributions to Literature; Descriptive, Critical, Humorous, Biographical, Philosophical, and Poetical, Boston, MA: Crosby, Nichols, and Company.
- Hamilton, William (1852), Discussions on Philosophy and Literature, Education and University Reform, etc., London: Longman, Brown, Green and Longmans.
- Hamilton, William (H.L. Mansell & J. Veitch, eds.) (1861a), Lectures on Metaphysics and Logic, in Four Volumes: Vol.I (Second Edition), Edinburgh: William Blackwood and Sons.
- Hamilton, William (H.L. Mansell & J. Veitch, eds.) (1861b), Lectures on Metaphysics and Logic, in Four Volumes: Vol.II (Second Edition), Edinburgh: William Blackwood and Sons.
- Henry, Caleb Sprague (1856), "Brown", pp. 171–190 in Caleb Sprague Henry, An Epitome of the History of Philosophy: Being the Work Adopted by the University of France for Instruction in the Colleges and High Schools: Translated from the French, with Additions, and a Continuation of the History from the Time of Reid to the Present Day, in Two Volumes: Vol.II, New York, NY: Harper & Brothers.
- Hedge, Levi (1827a), A Treatise on the Philosophy of the Human Mind, Being the Lectures of the Late Thomas Brown, M.D., Professor of Moral Philosophy in the University of Edinburgh: Abridged, and Distributed according to the Natural Divisions of the Subject by Levi Hedge, Professor of Logic and Metaphysics in Harvard University, in Two Volumes: Volume I, Cambridge, MA: Hilliard and Brown.
- Hedge, Levi (1827b), A Treatise on the Philosophy of the Human Mind, Being the Lectures of the Late Thomas Brown, M.D., Professor of Moral Philosophy in the University of Edinburgh: Abridged, and Distributed according to the Natural Divisions of the Subject by Levi Hedge, Professor of Logic and Metaphysics in Harvard University, in Two Volumes: Volume II, Cambridge, MA: Hilliard and Brown.
- Landes, Margaret W. (1926), "Thomas Brown: Associationist(?)", The Philosophical Review, Vol.35, No.5, (September 1926), pp. 447–464.
- McCosh, James (1874), "XLIV. Thomas Brown", pp. 317–337 in James McCosh, The Scottish Philosophy: Biographical, Expository, Critical: from Hutcheson to Hamilton, New York, NY: Robert Carter and Brothers.
- Meiring, Henry-James (2020). "Thomas Robert Malthus, naturalist of the mind". Annals of Science. 77 (4): 495–523. doi:10.1080/00033790.2020.1823479. PMID 33028149. S2CID 222214071.
- Mill, John Stuart (1865), An Examination of Sir William Hamilton's Philosophy and of the Principal Philosophical Questions Discussed in his Writings, London: Longman, Brown, Green and Longmans.
- Rands, Alma Clara (1970), "Thomas Brown's Theories of Association and Perception as They Relate to His Theories of Poetry", The Journal of Aesthetics and Art Criticism, Vol.28, No.4 (Summer 1970), pp. 473–483. JSTOR 428487
- Waterston, Charles D. & Macmillan Shearer, Angus (eds.) (2006), Biographical Index of Former Fellows of The Royal Society of Edinburgh, 1783–2002: Part I: A–J, Edinburgh: Royal Society of Edinburgh. ISBN 090219884X
- Welsh, David (1825), Account of the Life and Writings of Thomas Brown, M.D., Late Professor of Moral Philosophy in the University of Edinburgh, Edinburgh: W. & C. Tait.
- Yeates, Lindsay B. (2016), "Émile Coué and his Method (II): Hypnotism, Suggestion, Ego-Strengthening, and Autosuggestion", Australian Journal of Clinical Hypnotherapy & Hypnosis, 38(1), pp. 28–54.
