= William Alford =

William Alford may refer to:

- William VanMeter Alford Jr. (born 1945), admiral in the U.S. Navy
- William P. Alford (born 1948), American legal scholar
- William "Red" Alford (1937–2003), American mathematician
- William H. Alford (1866–1907), American attorney and politician in California
- Billy Alford (born 1981), American football defensive back
- Sir William Alford, Custos Rotulorum of the East Riding of Yorkshire (served 1626–aft. 1636)
