= Alford =

Alford may refer to:

== People ==
- Alford (surname)

== Places ==
Australia

- Alford, South Australia

England

- Alford, Lincolnshire
  - Alford Manor House
  - Alford Windmill
  - Queen Elizabeth's Grammar School, Alford
- Alford, Somerset
- Alford Crossways

Scotland

- Alford, Aberdeenshire
  - Alford Valley Railway

United States

- Alford, Florida
- Alford, Indiana
- Alford, Massachusetts

== Other uses ==
- Alford plea, in US law
  - North Carolina v. Alford, the Supreme Court case concerning the Alford plea

== See also ==
- Allford (disambiguation)
