= Thomas Robinson (composer) =

English composer and music teacher

Thomas Robinson (c. 1560 – c. 1610) was an English Renaissance composer and music teacher, who flourished around 1600. He taught and wrote music for lute, cittern, orpharion, bandora, viol, and voice.

== Biography ==
Very little is known about Robinson's life, but it is possible to draw conclusions from the dedicatory pages of his works. He and his father were in service of the Cecil family: Robinson's father worked for the 1st Earl of Salisbury, Robert Cecil, and Robinson was in the service of the 1st Earl of Exeter, Thomas Cecil, who was Robert Cecil's brother. The Cecil family fostered several artists in these days, amongst others William Byrd and Orlando Gibbons.

It was before 1589 that Robinson became Princess Anne's (1574–1619) and Queen Sophie's (1557–1631) private music teacher at Elsinore, Denmark. Princess Anne was the daughter of the King of Denmark, Frederick II (1559–1588). It is presumed that Robinson must have been in his twenties then, so that his birth can be dated back to around 1560.

The Court of Denmark, like other courts, employed many well-recognized musicians from Denmark and other countries, like England, France, Germany and the Netherlands. It is known that John Dowland – the most famous Renaissance lutenist nowadays – worked as a court lutenist in Denmark from 1598 to 1606. Besides Robinson's own mention of his employment there, no official record of it exists.

In 1603, Robinson published his first book, Medulla Musicke, of which no copy survived. It was even suggested (Ward JM, see "Literature"), that it was never published at all, although Robinson seems to be referring to it in the first pages of his second book: "Right courteous Gentlemen, and gentle Readers, your fauourable acceptance of my first fruits from idlenesse, hath eccited mee further to congratulate your Musicall endeauours." From: "The Schoole of Musicke", 1603

Also in 1603, Robinson brought out his second book, The Schoole of Musicke, a tutor for lute and other instruments. It displaced John Alford's book A Briefe and Easye Instruction from 1574 (an English translation of Adrian Le Roy's Briefve et facile instruction pour apprendre la tabulature) as the most important lute tutor in England from then on.

In 1609 Robinson's third book, New Citharen Lessons, was published. It was a cittern tutor for beginners and advanced learners.

Robinson's works for the most part consist of his own compositions. But there are also arrangements of other pieces of music, some of which are still rather popular: for instance "My Lord Willoughby's Welcome Home" (in: The Schoole of Musicke) or "Can she excuse my wrongs?" (in New Citharen Lessons) – both originally composed by John Dowland.

There is no further information available about Robinson's life after 1609.

== Works ==
=== Medulla Musicke ===
Medulla Musicke (The Stationer's Company, London, 1603) was a music tutor now presumably lost. It is supposed to have included 40 canons on the then popular plainsong Miserere after arrangements by William Byrd and Alfonso Ferrabosco.

=== The Schoole of Musicke ===
The Schoole of Musicke, (Tho. Este, London, 1603), was a tutor for lute, bandora, orpharion, viol, and singing.

==== Contents ====
1. The Queenes good Night (for two lutes)
2. Twenty waies upon the bels (for two lutes)
3. Row well you Marriners
4. A Galliard
5. A Galliard
6. A Plaine Song for 2 lutes (for two lutes)
7. Grisse his delight
8. Passamezzo Galliard (for two lutes)
9. A Fantasie for 2 lutes (for two lutes)
10. A Toy for 2 lutes (for two lutes)
11. A Galliard
12. Merry Melancholie
13. Robinson's Riddle
14. Goe from my Window
15. A Toy
16. A Gigue
17. An Almaigne
18. An Almaigne
19. A Toy
20. A Toy
21. Robin is to the greenwood gone
22. A Toy
23. The Queenes Gigue
24. Ut re mi fa so la: 9 sundry ways
25. My Lord Willobies Welcome Home
26. Bell Vedere
27. The Spanish Pavin
28. A Gigue
29. A Gigue
30. Walking in a country town
31. Bony sweet boy
32. A Gigue
33. Lantero
34. Three parts in one upon a[n old]ground
35. Sweet Jesu who shall lend me wings
36. A Psalme
37. O Lord of whom I do depend
38. O Lord thou art my righteousness

Furthermore, The Schoole of Musicke contains eight short pieces, seven of them called "A Psalme" in the chapter "Rules to instruct you to sing".

=== New Citharen Lessons ===
New Citharen Lessons, (London, 1609), was a cittern tutor for beginners and advanced learners. It included 53 compositions, the first 47 for four-course cittern (tuned e' d' g b), pieces 48 to 53 for fourteen-course cittern (tuned e' d' g b^{b} f d G F E D C BB^{b} AA GG).

==== Contents ====
1. My Lord Treasurer his Paven
2. The Galliard to the Pavin before
3. A Fantasie
4. Wades Welfare
5. Powles Carranta
6. O Cupid looke about thee
7. For two Citherens in the unison (A Jigge for two Citherens)
8. A Ground
9. Pipers Galiard
10. A Psalme
11. Philips Pavin
12. A Galiard
13. A Galiard: Can she excuse my wrongs
14. A Galiard
15. A Psalme
16. Passamezzo Paven
17. Oft I have forsworne her company
18. Galliard to the Quadron Pavin
19. An Almaine
20. A French Toy
21. Excuse me
22. Robinson Idelsbie
23. Shepard shoot home
24. Ioan come kisse me now
25. A Psalme
26. Passamezzo Galiard
27. The new Hunts up
28. Souches March
29. Whetelies wheat-sheafe
30. O Hone
31. An Almaine
32. An Almaine
33. Robinsons modicum
34. An Almaine
35. Farewell deare love
36. Alexander Chezum his Curranta
37. Robarts Request
38. The Quadro Pavin
39. For two Citharens
40. What if a day
41. Ah, alas, thou God of Gods
42. Now Cupid looke about thee
43. Pauuana Passamezzo
44. Mr. North his Novell
45. Fantasia
46. Fantasia 2
47. Fantasia 3
48. Fantasia 4

=== Others ===
There are some further pieces and arrangements from Thomas Robinson in other manuscripts:

- Spanish Pavan (in Add. MS 3056 (Cozens Lute Book), ca. 1595, Cambridge University Library) – a version in major
- Hay (in Dd. 9.33, 1600, Cambridge University Library)
- Pipers Galliard Jo Dowland. Tho. Robinson (in Ms. Dd. 4.23, Cambridge University Library)
- Galliard T. R. (in Ms. Dd. 4.23, Cambridge University Library)
- [The Hunt's Up] T: R. (in Ms. Dd. 4.23, Cambridge University Library)

== Bibliography ==
- Lumsden, David (pub.) Thomas Robinson: The Schoole of Musicke. Paris, Editions du Centre National de la Recherche Scientifique, 1971, ISBN 2-222-01343-7
- William Casey (pub.), Alfredo Colman (pub.), Thomas Robinson: New Citharen Lessons (1609), 1997 Baylor University Press, Waco, Texas, ISBN 0-918954-65-7
- John M Ward, Sprightly and Cheerful Musick: Notes on the Cittern, Gittern & Guitar in 16th- & 17th-Century England in: The Lute Society Journal 21 (1979–81): 69–70
- G. Doc Rossi, Cittern Music of Thomas Robinson, 2007 Cetra Publishing, Michigan, USA. Contains New Citharen Lessons plus all known pieces in manuscripts. 2 volumes – Vol. I Tablature. Vol. II Commentary and transcriptions. Available in print and as eBook.
