= My Robin is to the greenwood gone =

Traditional song

"My Robin is to the greenwood gone" or "Bonny Sweet Robin" is an English popular tune from the Renaissance.

The earliest extant score of the ballad appears in William Ballet's Lute Book (c. 1600) as "Robin Hood is to the greenwood gone". References to the song can be dated back to 1586, in a letter from Sir Walter Raleigh to Robert Dudley, 1st Earl of Leicester saying "The Queen is in very good terms with you now, and, thanks be to God, will be pacified, and you are again her Sweet Robin."

Although the words have been lost, it is suspected that the character Ophelia, who is specified in the First Quarto version of Hamlet to be a lutenist, sings the last line of the tune ("For bonny sweet Robin is all my joy") during her madness (Hamlet 4.5/210). Some scholars believe that Shakespeare's choice of the song was meant to invoke phallic symbolism.

== Settings ==
As was common during the renaissance, many composers wrote variations or divisions based on the piece. Two sets of variations can be found in the Fitzwilliam Virginal Book, one by John Munday and the other by Giles Farnaby.

The work was commonly set for lute. It appears twice in William Ballet's lute book, in the Pickering Lute book, Anthony Holborne's Cittharn Schoole (1597), and Thomas Robinson's Schoole of Musicke (1603). There exists also a manuscript of John Dowland's setting.

The tune was often used for other texts too, such ballads can be found in the Roxburghe Ballads and in The Crown Garden of Golden Roses, and was used as such into the 18th century in Music for the Tea Table Miscellany (1725).

More recently, the song inspired Percy Grainger's "music room rambling" (as he described it) for which he wrote three instrumentations: solo piano; violin, cello and piano; and strings, flute and English horn. Ethel Smyth also wrote a set of variations on it for flute, oboe, and piano.
