= Allford =

Allford may refer to:

== People with the family name ==
- Grant Allford (born 1950), Australian rules footballer
- Simon Allford (born 1961), British architect

== Architectural firm ==
- Allford Hall Monaghan Morris, British architectural firm based in London, founded in 1989

== See also ==
- Alford (disambiguation)
