= T. Alford-Smith =

British geographer

Thomas Alford-Smith FRGS (1864–1936) was a British geographer. An educator at St Dunstan's College, he authored several influential early 20th-century works on the geography of Europe and North America.

== Biography ==
Thomas Alford-Smith was born in the United States in 1864. He joined the staff at St Dunstan's College, Catford, London in 1897, where he remained until his retirement in July 1929. Alford-Smith's early interest in geography was simulated by his associations with Andrew John Herbertson. He became a life member of the Geographical Association in 1903 and later a Fellow of the Royal Geographical Society. Alford-Smith was well known as a teacher in geography, and his book on the geography of North America was widely used both in the United Kingdom and the United States. For several years, Alford-Smith served as an examiner in geography for the University of Cambridge, the University of London, the Northern Universities Joint Board, the Civil Service Commission and the Royal Society of Arts. He died on Lewisham, London on 6 March 1936.
