= Walter Alsford =

English footballer

Personal information
- Full name: Walter John Alsford
- Date of birth: 6 November 1911
- Place of birth: Edmonton, England
- Date of death: 3 June 1968 (aged 56)
- Height: 5 ft 11 in (1.80 m)
- Positions: Outside left; wing half

Senior career*
Years	Team	Apps	(Gls)
1930–1936	Tottenham Hotspur	81	(0)
1936–1937	Nottingham Forest	30	(0)

International career
1935	England	1	(0)
- * Club domestic league appearances and goals

Walter John Alsford (6 November 1911 – 3 June 1968) was an English footballer who played for Tottenham Hotspur and Nottingham Forest, as well as the England national side.
