= David Welsh =

Scottish divine and academic

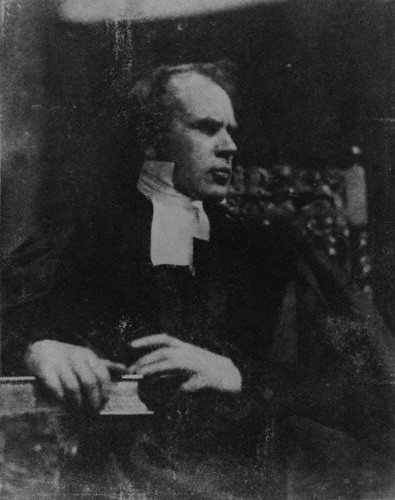
David Welsh

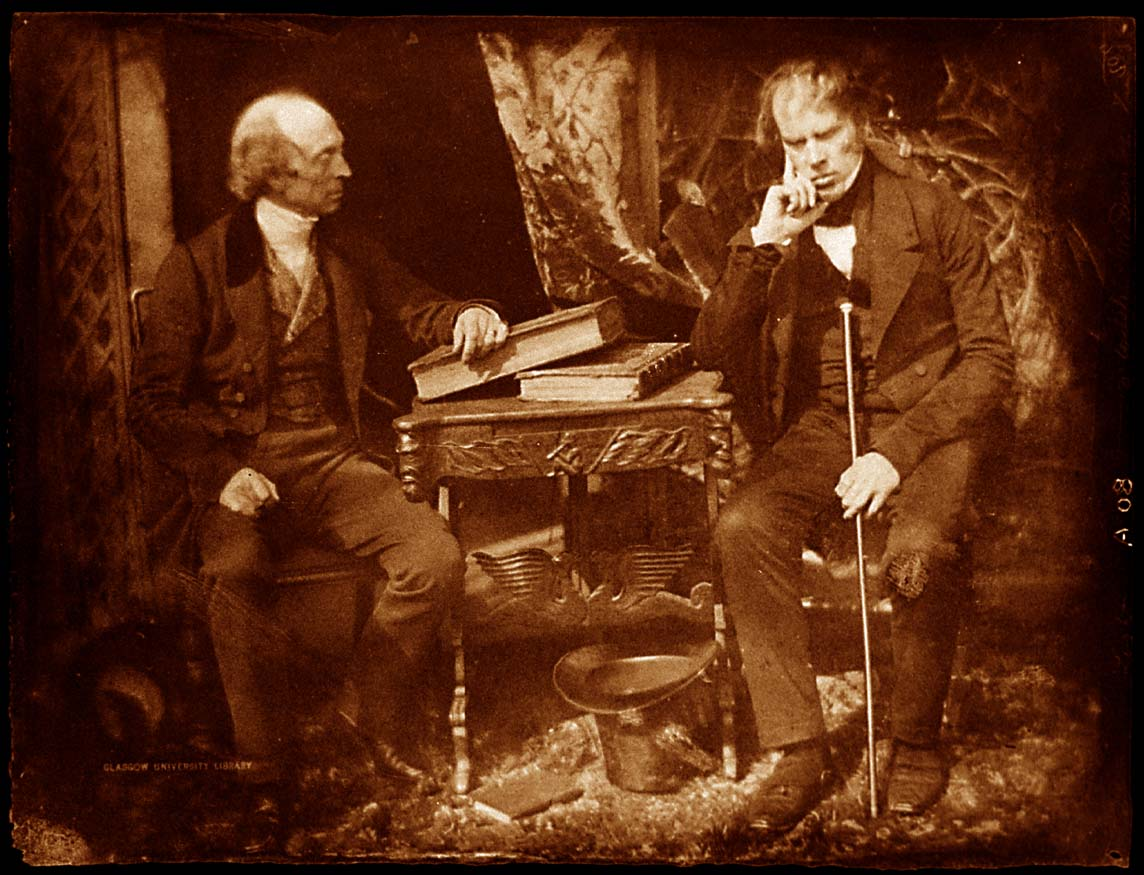
Mr Dunlop and David Welsh by Hill & Adamson

Disruption brooch showing the graves of Andrew Melville, John Knox, David Welsh, James Renwick, and Alexander Henderson

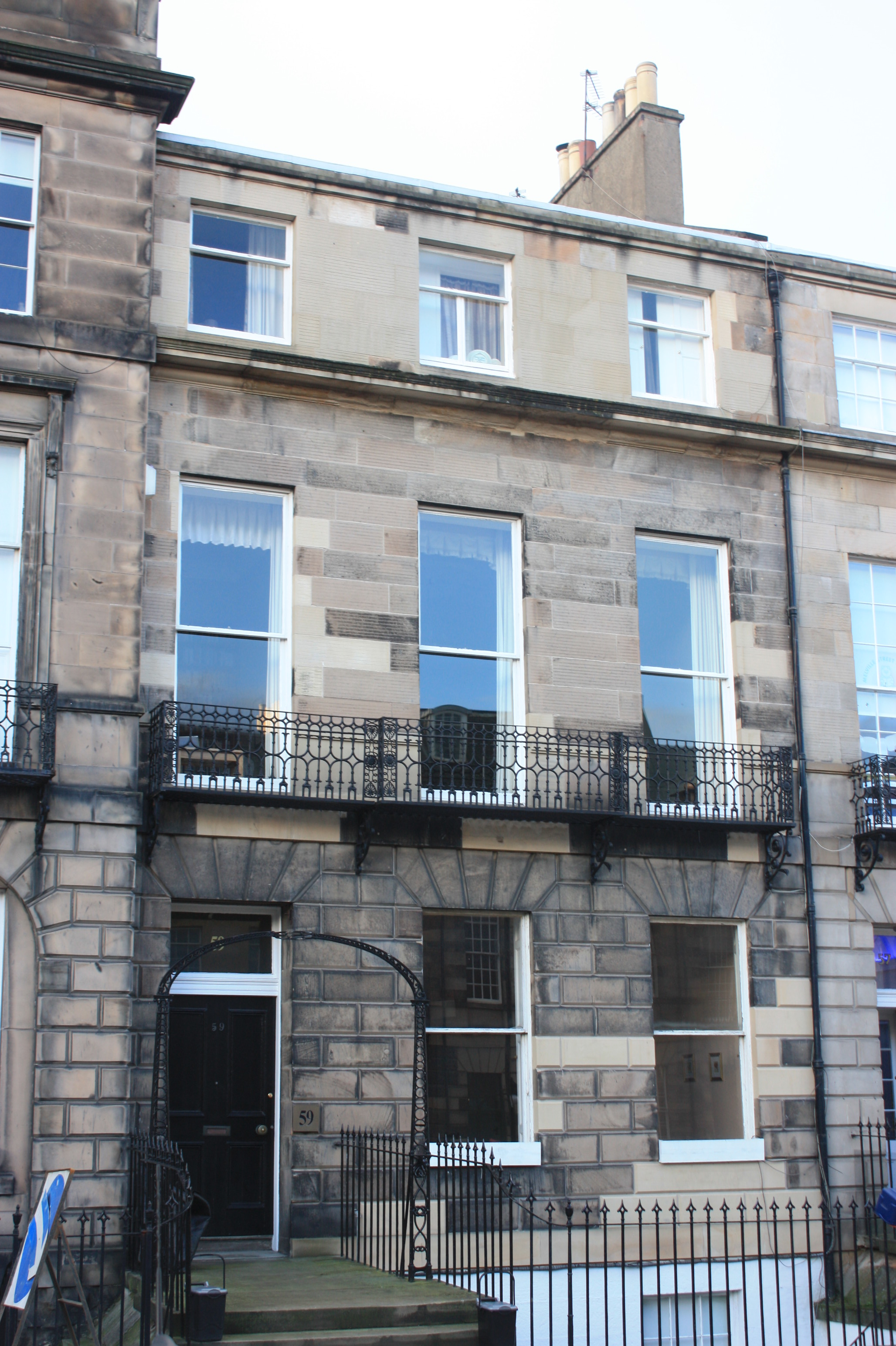
Welsh's townhouse at 59 Melville Street, Edinburgh

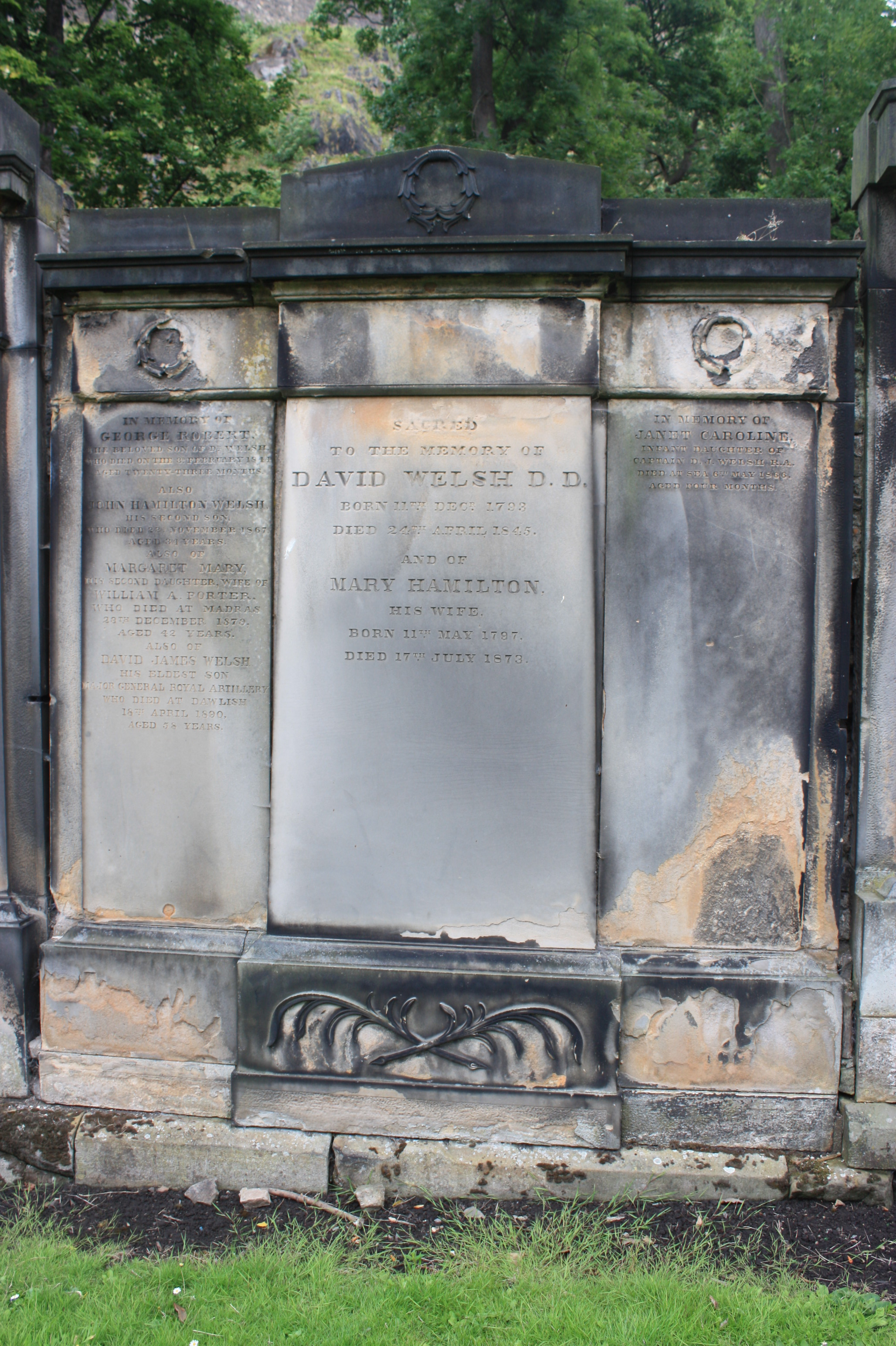
The grave of David Welsh, St Cuthbert's churchyard, Edinburgh

David Welsh FRSE (11 December 1793 – 24 April 1845) was a Scottish Presbyterian minister and academic. He was Moderator of the General Assembly of the Church of Scotland in 1842. In the Disruption of 1843 he was one of the leading figures in the establishment of the Free Church of Scotland.

== Life ==
Welsh was born at Braefoot Farm near Moffat on 11 December 1793, the youngest of 12 children of David Welsh, a sheep farmer at Earlhaugh and Tweedshaws, and his wife (and cousin) Margaret Welsh daughter of Alexander Welsh of Patervan.

He was educated at Moffat Parish School, and tutored at home by Rev McWhir, later minister of Urr in Galloway, then David was sent to the High School in Edinburgh. He studied divinity at the University of Edinburgh and was licensed to preach in 1816 by the Presbytery of Lochmaben. In 1821 he was ordained as minister of Crossmichael. From there he was translated to St David's Church in Glasgow. Glasgow University granted him a Doctor of Divinity (DD) in 1831.

In the 1820s, Welsh was notable for his attempt to forge an alliance between the evangelicals and the Edinburgh Phrenological Society - then at the height of its influence. However, Welsh was out-manoeuvered by George Combe - the "high priest" of the phrenologists - who prohibited all discussion of religious matters at phrenological meetings. Welsh and his fellow evangelicals then left the society.

In 1831 he was appointed professor of ecclesiastical history in the University of Edinburgh. In 1834 he was elected a fellow of the Royal Society of Edinburgh, his proposer being Sir William Hamilton.

Welsh later presided at a major event in 19th-century church history. In 1842 he was Moderator of the General Assembly of the Church of Scotland therefore being moderator during the critical Disruption of 1843. Sadly for the established church, but happily for the Free Church, he headed the secession on the day of the exodus. He then chaired the first General Assembly of the Free Church of Scotland. He is seen on the Disruption Painting by Hill to Thomas Chalmers's right holding the protest he read to the Church of Scotland assembly.

He was secretary of the Scottish Bible Board and also editor of the North British Review.

In later life he lived with his family at his Edinburgh townhouse, 59 Melville Street.

He retired to Drumfork House near Helensburgh in his final years. He died of a heart attack on 24 April 1845 at Camus Eskan in Dunbartonshire, and is buried against the western outer wall of the southern section of St Cuthbert's churchyard in Edinburgh.

== Family ==
David Welsh was married to Mary Hamilton (1797–1873) in Glasgow on 1 June 1830. Mary was sister to William Hamilton, Lord Provost of Glasgow from 1826 to 1828. Her father John Hamilton was three times Lord Provost of Glasgow and her paternal grandfather Rev Dr John Hamilton served in St Mungos (Glasgow Cathedral) and was Moderator of the General Assembly of the Church of Scotland in 1766.

They had 10 children, including:

- David James Welsh FRSE (1832–1890), Major-General in the Royal Artillery;
- John Hamilton (1833–1867), merchant;
- Helen (c. 1835 – ?);
- Margaret Mary (1837–1879), who married William A. Porter, secretary to the Maharaja of Mysore; and
- George Robert (1842–1844).

== Publications ==
- The Life and Writings of Thomas Brown (1825)
- The Elements of Church History (1844)

== Sources ==
- Allibone, S. Austin (1897). A critical dictionary of English literature and British and American authors, living and deceased, from the earliest accounts to the latter half of the nineteenth century. Containing over forty-six thousand articles (authors), with forty indexes of subjects. Vol. 3. Philadelphia: J. B. Lippincott. pp. 2643-2644.
- Welsh, David; Colquhoun-Stirling-Murray-Dunlop, Alexander (1846). Sermons by the Late Reverend David Welsh D.D. With a Memoir by A. Dunlop. Edinburgh: W. P. Kennedy.
- Stronach, George (1899). "Welsh, David". In Lee, Sidney (ed.). Dictionary of National Biography. Vol. 60. London: Smith, Elder & Co. p. 237-238.
