= Levi Hedge =

Levi Hedge (April 19, 1766 – January 3, 1844) was an American educator and professor at Harvard University.

== Early life and education ==
Hedge was born in Hardwick, Massachusetts. He graduated from Harvard University in 1792. His independent stand against hazing while still a student was instrumental in ridding Harvard of the injustice associated with its "hat law".

== Career ==
He was a teacher at Westford Academy in Westford, Massachusetts from 1792 to 1794.

In 1795, he was appointed a tutor at Harvard University. In 1805, he was elected a fellow of the American Academy of Arts and Sciences.

In 1810, Hedge became professor of logic and metaphysics. In 1816, he was elected a member of the American Antiquarian Society. He published Elements of Logick in 1816, and subsequent editions to it, and was translated into German.

In 1827, he was appointed the Alford professorship of natural religion, moral philosophy, and civil polity. That year, he also prepared an abridgment of Thomas Brown's Mental Philosophy.

An attack of paralysis compelled him to resign from Harvard in 1830.

== Personal life ==
In 1801, he married Mary Kneeland, with whom he had eight children, including Frederic Henry Hedge, who became a clergyman, transcendentalist, scholar of German literature, and also a Harvard professor.

== Death ==
He died in Cambridge, Massachusetts in 1844.
