= Stephen Alford =

British historian and academic (born 1970)

Stephen Alford FRHistS (born 1970) is a British historian and academic. He has been professor of early modern British history at the University of Leeds since 2012.

== Life ==
Educated at the University of St Andrews, he was formerly a British Academy Post-doctoral Research Fellow at the University of Cambridge (1997–1999) and junior research fellow of Fitzwilliam College, Cambridge and, between 1999 and 2012, a fellow in history at King's College, Cambridge. He has been a fellow of the Royal Historical Society since 2000. He was taught by John Guy.

== Selected publications ==
- The Early Elizabethan Polity: William Cecil and the British Succession Crisis, 1558-1569. Cambridge University Press, 1998.
- Kingship and Politics in the Reign of Edward VI. Cambridge University Press, 2002.
- Burghley: William Cecil at the Court of Elizabeth I. Yale University Press, New Haven, 2008.
- The Watchers: A Secret History of the Reign of Elizabeth I. Allen Lane, 2012. ISBN 9780141930848
- Edward VI: The last boy king. Allen Lane, 2014. ISBN 9780141976914
- London's Triumph: Merchant Adventurers and the Tudor City. Allen Lane, 2017. ISBN 9780241003589
- All His Spies: The Secret World of Robert Cecil. Allen Lane, 2024. ISBN 9780241423479
