= Paul Alford =

Athlete

Profile
- Positions: Guard, Halfback

Personal information
- Born: November 29, 1928; Hamilton, Ontario, Canada
- Died: February 13, 2002 (aged 73)
- Listed height: 5 ft 11 in (1.80 m)
- Listed weight: 210 lb (95 kg)

Career information
- ORFU (Jrs.): Hamilton Wildcats/Hamilton Tigers

Career history
- 1950: Edmonton Eskimos
- 1951–1952: Calgary Stampeders
- 1955–: Ottawa Rough Riders

Paul Alford (b. November 29, 1928 - d. February 13, 2002) is a Canadian former professional football guard and running back who played for the Edmonton Eskimos and Calgary Stampeders of the Canadian Football League. Alford played in 24 regular season games from 1950 to 1952.

After an inactive season, he joined the Ottawa Rough Riders in 1955.
