= Sam Alford =

English rugby union player (born 1986)

Sam Alford born 23 November 1986 in England is a rugby union player for Bristol in the Guinness Premiership. He plays as a scrum-half. Alford signed for Bristol for the 2008/09 season and made his first team debut against Northampton Saints in the EDF cup. Previous Clubs: Bath Rugby West Brisbane Bulldogs Cornish All Blacks London Welsh (Loan Period)
