= Niki Alsford =

British academic

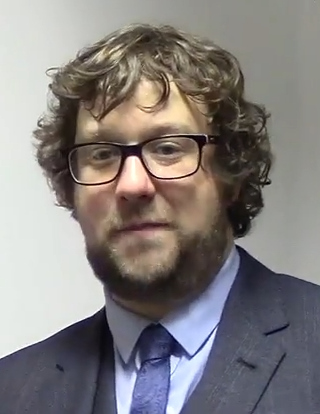
Niki Alsford in 2018

Niki Joseph Paul Alsford FRAS FRAI FHEA FRGS is a British academic specializing in Taiwan studies and the wider Pacific.

Upon completing his bachelor's degree with honours at the University of Southampton, Alsford pursued a master's degree at National Chengchi University in Taiwan, followed by a doctorate at SOAS, University of London. He is a professor of Anthropology and Human Geography at the University of Central Lancashire. Alsford was nominated a fellow of the Royal Asiatic Society in 2013, a fellow of the Higher Education Academy in 2017, and a fellow of the Royal Anthropological Institute of Great Britain and Ireland in 2019.

Trained in social anthropology, Alsford's primary research focus centres on the study of Taiwan and the Pacific Islands. In particular, the study of Taiwan Indigenous peoples and the broader discussions on Austronesian migration and the maritime cultures of the Pacific. In 2024, Alsford was given the Ralph Brown Award for his work with the Haenyeo (women divers) of Jeju Island in South Korea.
