= Sidney Alford =

English explosives expert (1935–2021)

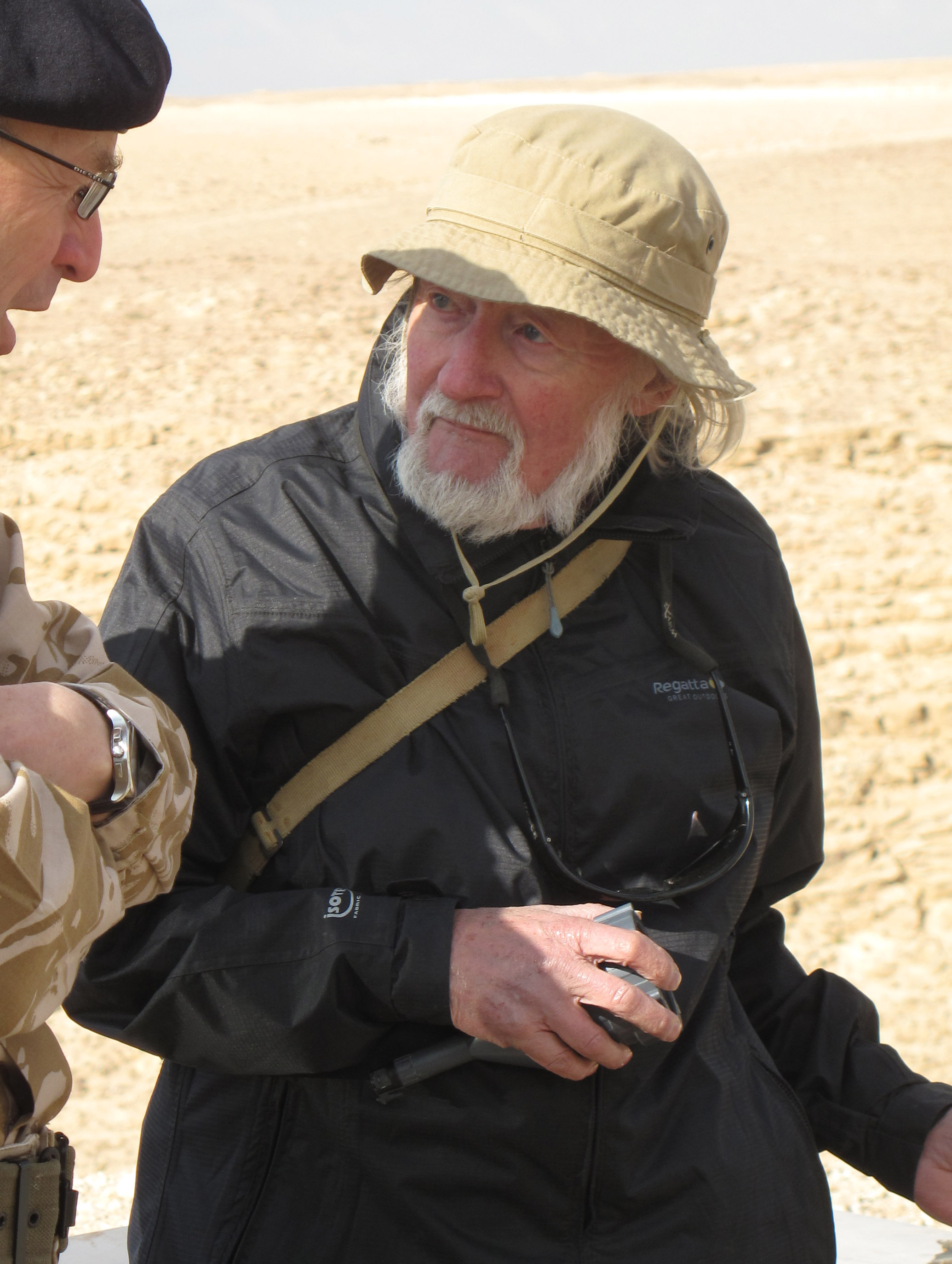
- Alford in 2009
- Born: 1935; Ilford, Essex, England
- Died: 27 January 2021 (aged 86)
- Occupations: Chairman at Alford Technologies, explosives engineer, and inventor

Sidney Christopher Alford OBE (11 January 1935 – 27 January 2021) was an English inventor, explosives engineer and a doctor of chemistry. Alford was the Chairman of Alford Technologies Limited, a world-leading provider of explosive engineering and explosive charge technology, that he founded in 1985. In 2015 he was awarded the OBE in Her Majesty the Queen's Birthday Honours for services to explosive ordnance disposal.

Alford is considered the pioneer in water projecting disruptors driven by high explosive. These are used in bomb disposal. He also developed the renowned Dioplex linear cutting charge, and Vulcan shaped charge. Alford's explosive charges are some of the most highly regarded in the industry and are said to have saved many lives. Alford's equipment was used to support operations in Afghanistan in countering the threat from Improvised Explosive Devices (IEDs).

== Early life ==
Alford was born in Ilford, a suburb of London, and was one of two children. During the early stages of the Second World War he moved with his family to Bournemouth on the south coast where "tip and run" German aircraft raids introduced him to machine gun fire and air-dropped bombs.

Returning to Ilford (1942, aged 7) he experienced more aircraft bombs, usually dropped under cover of night, and he started a collection of fragments of bombs and of anti-aircraft shells. His searches occasionally rewarded him with magnalium incendiary bombs, the bodies of which later provided a source of metal for his earliest fireworks. Alford's interest in explosives and pyrotechnics was born. On one occasion Alford found a complete flying bomb engine in Epping Forest. He had the opportunity to hear and observe the V-1 flying bomb ("Doodlebugs") and V2 rockets and was able to compare and contrast their effects.

Fascination with the technology of warfare, its causes and its effects upon the cultures of the people involved, remained with him.

== Career ==
His professional life began as a chemist and, in 1966, he was awarded a doctorate of the University of Paris (mention très honorable) for research on the chemistry of plant products carried out at one of Europe's oldest organic chemistry laboratories in the Muséum National d'Histoire Naturelle under Professor Charles Mentzer. The following two years at Tokyo and Waseda Universities gave him some understanding of research in Japan and the language respectively.

Returning to England in 1969, he joined a tiny company in Piccadilly organising clinical trials of a diet developed for NASA for astronauts. This work brought him into contact with some prominent physicians, pathologists, surgeons and biochemists and one of the latter, Dr (now Professor) Michael Crawford of the Nuffield Institute of Comparative Medicine, offered him a bench in his department which specialised in the study of the chemistry and nutritional implications of fatty acids in the diet.

Unable to raise funds sufficient to enable him to continue his research, Alford moved from central London to Ham in its western suburbs. The "Troubles" in Northern Ireland awoke Alford's interest in explosives and he began to consider more effective means of defeating improvised explosive devices (IEDs) than such devices as rocket propelled grenades (RPGs) with cement-filled warheads. He experimented with the use of elongated gas cylinders, filled with liquid carbon dioxide and provided with an axial tube containing a small explosive charge, as a penetrative disruptor of potentially buried packages.

The use of letter bombs by the Black September Organization (BSO), one of which had killed a diplomat in the Israeli embassy in September 1972, led him to develop blast absorbing vermiculite-based containers for small suspect devices which enabled them to be transported in relative safety. These were purported to be the first blast containers of their kind.

In 1974 a visit by the Security Service resulted in Alford being offered a job as a part-time conference interpreter by the MoD using his knowledge of both languages and explosives. This helped sustain him and his young family while he studied for an MSc in Environmental Pollution Science at Brunel University.

In 1976 the Royal Armaments Research & Development Establishment (RARDE) at Fort Halstead (later to become DSTL) arranged for Wallop Industries (now Wallop Defence Systems) to provide facilities for him to develop one of his inventions, the water lined and water-filled shaped charge, initially made in his house and tested in his garden, in more orthodox surroundings. Alford's findings were ground-breaking at the time, and were some of the first demonstrations of using water-tamped charges for countering the emerging threat from IEDs. Other inventions were made in the course of this research but eventually Alford received a letter, which he kept with pride, effectively ordering him to stop having any more new ideas since he did not work for Fort Halstead.

Undeterred, Alford moved to Wiltshire in the south west of England and joined Leafield Engineering where he continued to develop novel explosive charges but realised that his future did not lie therein when he was told by the head of sales that his devices worked well enough but some of them, because of their novelty, did not look as if they would work. During this time – in June 1978 – Alford was elected a Fellow of the Institute of Explosives Engineers (IExpE).

He accepted an invitation to join Hotforge, a small company which provided explosives services to the petroleum industry, and was offered a directorship. He was thus able to devote himself to the development of explosive cutting charges. Alford designed underwater steel-cutting charges which he used for chain cutting, plate perforating (using his new trepanning charges) and well-head severing operations in the North Sea for the petroleum industry. His first experiments using flexible linear fracturing charges which depended upon the collision of shock waves were demonstrated and patented.

In mid-1981 he was approached by a retired army officer and his colleague and they formed a new company, Alflex, whose first operation was participation in the record breaking expedition to the Barents Sea which recovered 93 per cent of the approximately five tonnes of gold ingots from the wreck of HMS Edinburgh. During the next three years he acquired a great deal of experience in demolition, felling numerous brick, concrete and steel chimneys. In 1985, Alford started his own company, Sidney Alford Ltd with his wife, Itsuko as co-director. He carried out many explosive demolition operations on such steel and concrete structures as bridges, industrial buildings and, very sadly from a historical point of view, the blast furnaces at the Consett Iron Company which closed in 1980. The old manually operated iron penstock gates beneath the Royal Dockyard in Portsmouth and Gibraltar Harbour were gently blasted into removable fragments and replaced by modern hydraulic structures. Various other underwater operations were conducted for marine salvage companies.

Subsequent operational work carried out by Alford included marine salvage during the "Tanker War" in the Persian Gulf (1984/8), including the sectioning of large oil tankers whose hulls had been blown open by Iran's Revolutionary Guards and air attacks; this work was carried out under the Iranian flag in the uncomfortably close company of the Revolutionary Guard's speedboats with their heavy machine guns and RPGs. That activity was swiftly followed by the clearance of mines and sub-munitions and aircraft bombs immediately after the repulsed invasion of Kuwait by Iraq in 1992. The former work involved the development of the user-filled linear cutting charge in kit form which became known as Dioplex. Kuwait provided a testing ground for the development of what became the Vulcan, using its water-filled cone and his recently invented magnesium projectile.

The Vulcan shaped charge proved paramount in the clearance of large bombs in sea with the Royal Navy off the Scottish coast and of limpet mines and shells with the US Navy off Pearl Harbor in 2002–2003, made possible by the addition of a component which permitted its reliable use under water. In 2002 Sidney's son Roland, a graduate in mechanical engineering, became a director of the family owned company.

When the Vietnam war finally stopped, the huge number of bombs which had been dropped on Indo-China became apparent, as did the very high proportion which had not exploded as they hit the trees and soft soil. It was at the invitation of the Mines Advisory Group (MAG) that Alford was enabled, in February 2000, to return to Laos, which he had first visited during the war. Accompanied by his son Roland, they tested the usefulness of the precursor of the Vulcan at rendering safe the larger bombs without destroying for a second or third time the village which had been targeted during the war. This led to the production of the Vulcan itself and further verification and instructional visits to Laos followed and valuable data was gathered which contributed to the device going into use in many countries.

In 1987, Alford's invention and ownership of water lined and water projecting shaped charge technology was reluctantly recognised by the UK Ministry of Defence (MOD). A settlement was reached with Alford, enabling UK MOD to legitimately develop their own water-based charge technology which incorporated Alford's ideas.

In 2002, Alford's son Roland Alford became managing director, with Sidney Alford becoming the company's chairman.

== Early Inventions ==
1976 – Water Filled & Water Lined Shaped Charge

The use of guns using blank cartridges to eject water from the barrel at high velocity was well known as a means of disrupting relatively small and thin-skinned targets with a relatively low probability of causing detonation or ignition. They were, however, easily defeated by the use of more robust cases, such as those made from structural steel tubes. The replacement of the copper liner of conventional shaped charges first by gelled water, then by low melting point salts with high proportions of water of crystallisation and finally with thin-walled plastic containers of water, provided a simple means of generating jets of water of much higher velocity and with correspondingly enhanced penetrating power and disruptive capability than was possible using gun barrel technology. Concomitant experiments demonstrated that, in contrast to metal-lined charges, shaped charges projecting liquids still functioned with their cavities filled rather than just lined with water.

One of Alford's early experiments involved a cucumber which was carved into a prism with a longitudinal V-shaped groove with a strip of sheet explosive behind. This generated a crude linear liquid jet capable of cutting steel. From this charge was developed a family of thin-walled plastic containers in which explosive was sandwiched between a grooved, water-filled, projectile and a rear water-filled component which acted as a tamper and flash suppressor. The series of production models derived from this cucumber include the MiniMod, the MLVD (Modular Large Vehicle Disruptor) and the BootBanger.

1987 – Dioplex User-Filled Linear Cutting Charge Kit

Alford's work during the "Tanker War" phase of the Gulf War inspired development of the user-filled linear cutting family of charges which became known as Dioplex. Alford was invited to attempt the cutting operations of the deformed hulls which, by the time he got on the scene were either floating or were run up on the shore of Sirri Island. For this he designed linear cutting charges which consisted of strips of plywood, which were glued into elongate rectangular boxes, with a 90-degree steel liner inside. Each charge was closed with glued-on end pieces with holes for detonators or detonating cord and with a plywood lid.

The primitive, user-filled charges proved themselves in cutting the substantial steel hull in air and under water and, not surprisingly, requirements for larger quantities for further wrecked tankers soon arrived and were flown out. Soon demand exceeded supply and so a quicker way of manufacturing was required.

The early Dioplex used a flat-packed, foldable plastic body and it went at once into service with the British army. The models which we know today are made of aluminum, extruded in square U configuration and with nominal widths of 20, 40 and 80mm. Subsequently, a 30mm model was introduced. These are now among the tools of choice for the explosive demolition of large steel-framed and reinforced buildings.

The name Dioplex was an abbreviation of Do It Oneself (a bit more up-market than DIY), Pliable Explosive. Patent protected.

1987 – The Vulcan Point Focal Shaped Charge

The need for point-focal penetration led to the development of the Vulcan-shaped charge system. After initial experiments using the precursor of the Vulcan to inject liquids which reacted hypergolically with the explosive fill of steel cased munitions, Alford realised that a magnesium cone, which was much more manageable than the liquids required for hypergolic reaction, formed a jet which ignited as it was formed. This was quickly shown to provide a simple and reliable means of bringing about relatively gentle deflagration of small and large steel cased munitions with only a low probability of causing detonation. Since then a range of projectiles has been developed for the Vulcan for various other applications.

Patent protected.

2002 – The Vulcan Counter Limpet Mine System (VCLMS) Shaped Charge

Based on the Vulcan shaped charge, the VCLMS provides the means of deploying the Vulcan quickly for reliable use under water. VCLMS was developed to support Mine Countermining (MCM) activities and the safe disposal of such conventional munitions found on the sea bed as World War II bombs.

== Recent Inventions ==
2012 – Alford Strip The Alford Strip is a high-efficiency tamped strip charge used by police breachers to split and blow open wooden doors and to cut laminated glass windows. Alford Strip is a lightweight low-fragmentation plastic strip filled with an inert water-based gel which acts as the tamping medium. Present models of the Alford Strip were designed by Dr Alford's son Roland Alford.

== Awards ==
In 2004 his Company, under its new name of Alford Technologies, won a Queen's Awards for Enterprise: Innovation for the Vulcan shaped charge system. This was followed by a second Queen's Award for Outstanding Innovation in 2009 for the development of User-Filled High Explosive Charges for the Neutralisation of Improvised Explosive Devices (IEDs). In July 2020, he was informed that he would be receiving the Navy Distinguished Public Service Award by the US Navy's Admiral Ver Hage. The receiving of the award has been put on hold due to COVID-19 restrictions.

On Tuesday 26 January 2021, the day before his death, Sidney was awarded the US Navy's Distinguished Public Service Award, the highest award available for a civilian.

== TV Programmes ==
- Kaboom, Windfall Films (TV Documentary), 1995
- D-Day: The Ultimate Conflict (TV documentary), 2004
- The Gunpowder Plot: Exploding the Legend (TV), 2005
- Weaponology (TV Documentary), 2007
  - Fire Weapons (TV Documentary), 2007
  - Frags, Pineapples, and RPGs (TV Documentary), 2007
  - Bomber (TV Documentary)
- Future Weapons (TV Documentary), 2007
  - No Escape featuring GateCrasher – wall breaching charge
  - The Protectors featuring BootBanger – car boot opening charge
  - Mission Invisible featuring Krakatoa – shaped charge
- Generals at War, 2009
- Explosions: How We Shook the World (TV Documentary), 2010
- The Passenger in Seat 19A (TV Episode), 2010
- Bang Goes the Theory, 2011
- Dambusters: Building the Bouncing Bomb (TV Documentary), 2011
- Bombing Hitler's Dams (TV Episode), 2012
- Gallileo (TV Current Affairs), 2012
- Kevin McCloud's Manmade Home, 2012
- Kevin McCloud's Manmade Home, 2013
- Bloody Tales: Napoleon Plot, 2013
