= Alford's Law =

Rule of biblical interpretation

This Law or Rule was formulated by Henry Alford (1810-1871) as a rule of biblical interpretation. It appeared in his monumental multi-volume work completed in 1861, The Greek Testament, which is still consulted today.

== Content ==
Alford presented the rule as follows with specific reference to the first resurrection in Rev. 20:4–6:

"If, in a passage where two resurrections are mentioned, where certain "souls lived" at the first, and the rest of the "dead lived" only at the end of a specified period after that first, - if in such a passage the first resurrection may be understood to mean spiritual rising with Christ, while the second means literal rising from the grave; then there is an end of all significance in language, and Scripture is wiped out as a definite testimony to anything. If the first resurrection is spiritual, then so is the second, which I suppose none will be hardy enough to maintain. But if the second is literal, then so is the first, which in common with the whole primitive Church and many of the best modern expositors, I do maintain, and receive as an article of faith and hope."

George Eldon Ladd refers to this “law” and cites the quote above in support of his position on Historic Premillennialism and the interpretation of the Book of Revelation chapter 20. Ladd writes:

"Natural inductive exegesis suggests that both words are to be taken in the same way, referring to literal resurrection. We can do no better than to repeat the oft-quoted words of Henry Alford ..."

The brief form of the quote from Alford above may also be found in works by Alva J. McClain, Joseph Seiss, and J. Barton Payne. A lengthier citation including the statement above is found in the works of William Eugene Blackstone, and George N. H. Peters:

"It will have been long ago anticipated by the readers of this commentary, that I cannot consent to distort its words from their plain sense and chronological place in the prophecy, on account of any considerations of difficulty, or any risk of abuses which the doctrine of the Millennium may bring with it. Those who lived next to the Apostles, and the whole Church for three hundred years, understood them in the plain literal sense; and it is a strange sight in these days to see expositors who are among the first in reverence of antiquity, complacently casting aside the most cogent instance of unanimity which primitive antiquity presents. As regards the text itself, no legitimate treatment of it will extort what is known as the spiritual interpretation now in fashion. If, in a passage where two resurrections are mentioned, where certain souls came to life at the first, and the rest of the dead came to life only at the end of a specified period after the first [v. 5a]—if in such a passage the first resurrection may be understood to mean spiritual rising with Christ, while the second means literal rising from the grave—then there is an end of all significance in language, and Scripture is wiped out as a definite testimony to anything. If the first resurrection is spiritual, then so is the second, which I suppose no one will be hardy enough to maintain. But if the second is literal, then so is the first, which in common with the primitive church and many of the best modern expositors, I do maintain and receive as an article of faith and hope."

Wayne Grudem cites the rule only to discredit it:

"There is no fixed rule in any language that when a word is used twice in close succession it must be used in the same sense both times. It is best simply to choose from the possible senses the one that best fits the context in each case."

John Piper has been cited concerning Alford as follows:

"When I'm stumped with a ... grammatical or syntactical or logical [question] in Paul, I go to Henry Alford. Henry Alford ... comes closer more consistently than any other commentator to asking my kinds of questions."
