= John Alford (lutenist) =

Musicians from London

John Alford (fl. 16th century) was a lutenist in London. He published there in 1568 a translation of Adrian Le Roy's work on the lute under the title of A Briefe and Easye Instruction to learne the tableture, to conduct and dispose the hande unto the Lute. Englished by J. A., with a cut of the lute. A 1574 edition added additional music. The work was the dominant English lute tutorial until Thomas Robinson's The Schoole of Musicke (1603).

== Work ==
- A Briefe and Easye Instruction to learne the tableture, to conduct and dispose the hande unto the Lute. Englished by J. A. (1568)
