= Harry L. Alford =

American arranger and composer of band marches (1875–1939)

Harry L. Alford (August 3, 1875 – March 4, 1939) was an American arranger and composer of band marches.

== Early life ==
Harry LaForrest Alford was born in Hudson, Michigan. His family moved to nearby Blissfield, Michigan two years later. As a boy Harry learned to play the slide trombone, piano, and organ. He also taught himself composition and arrangement.

He worked as a church organist and then as a trombonist in a theater orchestra. He recognized his deficiencies in formal training at this point. He studied at the Dana Musical Institute in Warren, Ohio (now part of Youngstown State University). Then, he became a trombonist with touring minstrel shows, wild west shows, and theatrical troupes.

By 1903, he was tired of the constant travel. He opened a custom arranging business in Chicago employing famous copyists and arrangers working in sound proof studios. The idea of arranging as a full-time career was unknown at that time. Alford's pit orchestra music for Eva Tanguay made him famous, and created a demand for music scored by him. He became known as the composer and arranger of ingenious quirky music. The Harry L. Alford Arranging Studios moved into the entire sixth floor of the State-Lake Theater in the early 1920s. The firm operated until 1940, producing over 34,000 arrangements.

== Band ==
Alford's first march for band was performed in Blissfield by a visiting show brass band when he was only fourteen. The success of this event encouraged him to compose marches and other works for the Blissfield band. He would continue to compose band music for the rest of his life.

Alford's best known work is likely that commissioned by bands. The director of the University of Illinois Band, Albert Austin Harding, commissioned him for some of the first football halftime extravaganza shows. These included his composition The World is Waiting for the Sunrise (1919). Another composition for Harding's band was The March of the Illini (1928, originally titled The Battle of Tippecanoe). Alford also composed music for Northwestern University band halftime shows.

Alford composed over 100 pieces of music. Two of his band marches are well known: The Glory of the Gridiron (1932), written for director Harding and the University of Illinois Band; and The Purple Carnival (1933), dedicated to director Glenn Cliffe Bainum and the Northwestern University Wildcat Marching Band). Other marches include Law and Order, March of the Jackies, Skyliner, and Call of the Elk (official march of the Benevolent and Protective Order of Elks).

Alford conducted the Knight's Templar Band of the Siloam Commandery in Chicago from 1927 until he died.

== Two Alfords ==
Harry L. Alford is sometimes confused with Kenneth J. Alford, composer of Colonel Bogey March. Kenneth Alford, sometimes called "the British March King," was the pen name of British bandmaster and composer Frederick Joseph Ricketts.

== Personal information ==
Alford's birth date differs in some sources. August 3, 1877, is the date that appears in the Illinois death index. Some sources give 1883 as the year, but Alford's daughter Ruth wrote in a letter that Alford was born in 1875 and not 1883. That year is consistent with the 1880 census (taken in June), in which Alford's age is 8, with his brother Earl aged 2. In the 1910 census he listed as 33 years old, and in the 1930 census he is listed as 50. His funeral notice in the Oak Park-River Forest newspaper says he was born August 4, 1879.

Alford was described in 1921 as being of medium height and build, quick and nervous and full of pep, and speaking rapidly in a high tenor voice. Music was his only hobby.

Alford married Lucille H. Teetzel on October 1, 1902. Together they had a son Harold, who became an airline pilot for Eastern Airlines. One of Alford's marches, Skyliner, was written for Harold. They also had a daughter, Ruth Marion (Mrs. Eric Bottoms). Lucille died on January 30, 1938.

Amongst Alford's closest friends were circus bandleader Merle Evans and composer and band leader John Philip Sousa. They were also clients of his arrangement company. When Sousa came to Alford's house for a meal, Lucille insisted he take off his white gloves before he could eat.

Harry Alford resided at the Medinah Country Club in Chicago for the winter months to be near his offices in the Chicago Loop. It was at that facility that he died after suffering a fatal heart attack on March 4, 1939, in Chicago, Illinois. He is buried at the Mount Emblem Cemetery in Elmhurst, Illinois.

== The Harry L. Alford Project ==
In 1990 researcher Rick Benjamin began work on a full-length book about Harry L. Alford, inspired by an admiration for the composer's unique band music and thousands of theater orchestra arrangements. Benjamin's project led him to find and interview Alford's daughter, Ruth, as well as several professional associates from the 1920s and '30s. Benjamin also collected hundreds of Alford scores, letters, photographs, and business papers. The first product of this effort came in 2013, with the release of the CD album, Minding the Score:The Music of Harry L. Alford on the New World Records label. It includes performances of twenty rare Alford scores and includes a thirty-two page illustrated booklet about Alford's music and career. The album was produced by multi-Grammy award winner Judith Sherman. Benjamin's work on his Harry L. Alford book is ongoing.
