= Henry Alford (theologian) =

English churchman, scholar, poet and writer (1810–1871)

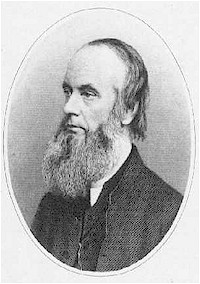
- Born: 7 October 1810; London, England
- Died: 12 January 1871 (aged 60)
- Resting place: St Martin's Church, Canterbury
- Occupations: churchman, scholar, poet and writer
- Spouse: Frances Oke Alford (cousin)
- Children: 2 sons and 2 daughters

Henry Alford (7 October 1810 – 12 January 1871) was an English churchman, theologian, textual critic, scholar, poet, hymnodist, and writer.

== Life ==
Alford was born at 25 Alfred Place, Bedford Square, London

of a Somersetshire family, which had given five consecutive generations of clergymen to the Anglican church. Alford's early years were passed with his widowed father, who was curate of Steeple Ashton in Wiltshire. He was a precocious lad, and before he was ten had written several Latin odes, a history of the Jews and a series of homiletic outlines. After a peripatetic school course he went up to Cambridge in 1827 as a scholar of Trinity in 1827. In 1832 he was 34th wrangler and 8th classic, and in 1834 was made a fellow of Trinity.

== Service ==
He had already taken orders, and in 1835 began his eighteen years' tenure of the vicarage of Wymeswold in Leicestershire, from which seclusion the twice-repeated offer of a colonial bishopric failed to draw him. He was Hulsean lecturer at Cambridge in 1841–1842, and steadily built up a reputation as scholar and preacher, which would have been enhanced but for his discursive ramblings in the fields of minor poetry and magazine editing.

In 1844, he joined the Cambridge Camden Society (CCS). He commissioned A.W.N. Pugin to restore St Mary's church. He also was a member of the Metaphysical Society, founded in 1869 by James Knowles.

In September 1853 Alford moved to Quebec Street Chapel, Marylebone, London, where he had a large and cultured congregation. In March 1857 Lord Palmerston advanced him to the deanery of Canterbury, where, till his death [...], he lived the same strenuous and diversified life that had always characterized him.

== Personal life ==
Henry Alford married his cousin Frances (Fanny) Oke Alford on 10 March 1835 in Curry Rivel, Somerset. They had four children, all born in Wymeswold, of whom both the sons died in childhood. The first was Clement Henry Oke, who died in 1844, aged 11 months; the second was his elder brother Ambrose Oke, who died in Babbacombe, Torquay aged 10, on 31 August 1850.

Henry and Francis' two daughters were:

(1) Alice Oke, born on 23 October 1836 and who died on 13 June 1908. She married William Thomas Bullock in Canterbury Cathedral. William, who was 18 years her senior, became the chaplain at Kensington Palace; he died on 27 February 1879.
(2) Frances Mary Oke, who married the Reverend Henry Edmund Tilsley Cruso on 12 February 1867 in Canterbury.

Henry Alford was the friend of many of his eminent contemporaries, and was much loved for his amiable character. He was buried at St Martin's Church, Canterbury. A description of the funeral and a tribute to Dean Alford were published in The Times. "The inscription on his tomb, chosen by himself, is Diversorium Viatoris Hierosolymam Proficiscentis ('the lodging place of a traveller on his way to Jerusalem')."

Frances Alford died in Middlesex on 18 November 1878.

== Published works ==
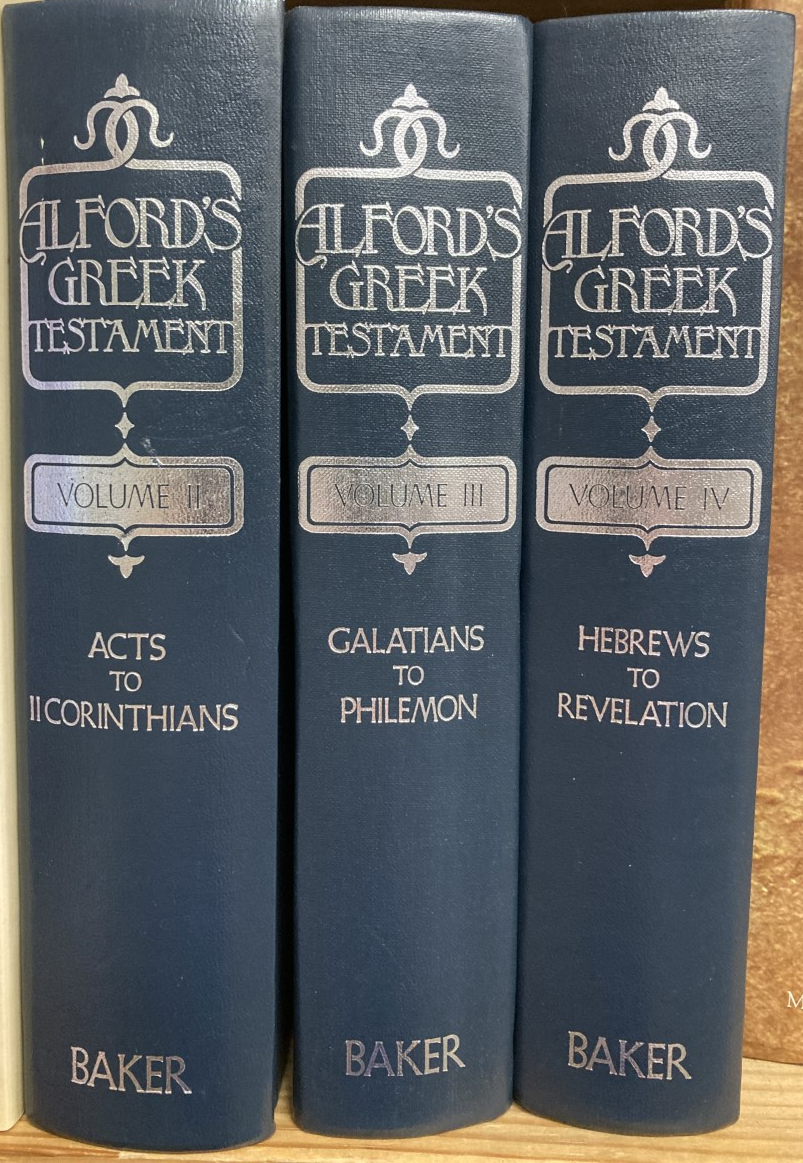
Volumes II-IV of Alford's New Testament in Greek

Alford was a talented artist, as his picture-book The Riviera (1870) shows, and he had abundant musical and mechanical talent. Besides editing the works of John Donne, he published several volumes of his own verse, The School of the Heart (1835), The Abbot of Muchelnaye (1841), The Greek Testament. The Four Gospels (1849), and a number of hymns, the best-known of which are "Forward! be our watchword," "Come, ye thankful people, come", and "Ten thousand times ten thousand." He translated the Odyssey, wrote a well-known manual of idiom, A Plea for the Queen's English (1863), and was the first editor of the Contemporary Review (1866–1870).

His chief fame, however, rests on his monumental edition of the New Testament in Greek (8 vols.), on which he worked from 1841 to 1861. In this work he first brought before English students a careful collation of the readings of the chief manuscripts and the researches of the ripest continental scholarship of his day. Philological rather than theological in character, it marked an epochal change from the old homiletic commentary, and though more recent research, patristic and papyral, has largely changed the method of New Testament exegesis, Alford's work is still a quarry where the student can dig with a good deal of profit.

See Alford's Law for an example. Alford subsequently published the New Testament for English Readers (4 vols., Rivingtons, 1868). "His Life, written by his widow, appeared in 1873 (Rivingtons)."

== Split infinitive ==
Alford is given credit (or blame) for the belief that split infinitives are ungrammatical in English. In his Plea for the Queen's English in 1864, he offered this anecdote:

A correspondent states as his own usage, and defends, the insertion of an adverb between the sign of the infinitive mood and the verb. He gives as an instance, "to scientifically illustrate." But surely this is a practice entirely unknown to English speakers and writers. It seems to me, that we ever regard the to of the infinitive as inseparable from its verb. And, when we have already a choice between two forms of expression, "scientifically to illustrate" and "to illustrate scientifically," there seems no good reason for flying in the face of common usage.

== Bibliography ==
- Julian, John (June 1907). A Dictionary of Hymnology. London: John Murray. pp. 39–40.
- Bailey, Albert Edward (1950). The Gospel in Hymns. New York: Charles Scribner's sons. pp. 390–392.
- Nutter, Charles S. "Alford, Henry". Charles S. Nutter: Hymn Writers of the Church - Christian Classics Ethereal Library. Hymn Writers of the Church – via Christian Classics Ethereal Library.
- Trubshaw, Bob. "St Mary's restoration". Archived from the original on 28 September 2007.
- Schaff, Philip. "The New Schaff-Herzog Encyclopedia of Religious Knowledge".
- Geraci, Paolo (March 2000). Loano isola del Ponente. Variazioni su un tema di Alford. I. Gressoney Saint Jean, Ao, I: Monboso Casa Editrice. pp. XXIII–XXIV.

Church of England titles
Preceded by William Rowe Lyall	Dean of Canterbury; 1857–1871	Succeeded by Robert Payne Smith
