= Henry King Alford =

Australian politician (1852–1930)

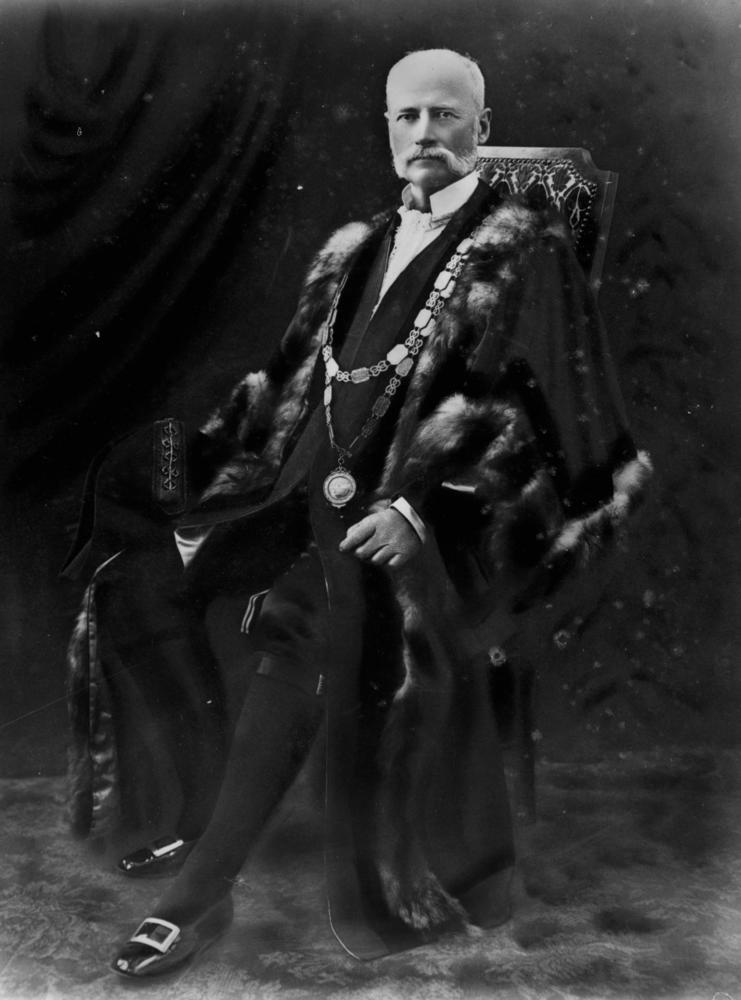
- Henry King Alford ca. 1911.
- Born: 22 July 1852; Toowoomba, Colony of New South Wales
- Died: 17 August 1930 (aged 78)

Henry King Alford (1852–1930) was the mayor of Toowoomba, Queensland from 1911–1912. He was born on 22 July 1852 to Thomas Alford, a pioneer in the Toowoomba district, and is reputed to be the first white child born in Toowoomba. He worked at the Australian Joint Stock Bank as a young man before becoming involved in real estate. He died on 19 August 1930.
