= John Alford (cricketer) =

English cricketer

John Alford (born 8 January 1941, in Salisbury, Wiltshire) was an English first-class cricketer. He was a right-handed batsman and right-arm medium-fast bowler who played for Wiltshire.

Alford made two List A appearances for the team between 1972 and 1973, having represented the team in miscellaneous matches since 1967. From the tailend, he scored 8 runs in the first match in which he played and 5 runs in the second. Alford bowled 15 overs, taking two wickets.
