= John M. Alford =

United States Navy admiral

John Morris Alford II (April 13, 1915 – December 17, 1988) was an American US Navy rear admiral who was Commander Naval Forces Korea from September 1962 to March 1964.

Alford was born on April 13, 1915, to doctor John Merlin Alford and Shirley Foote Alford in Galva, IL. He graduated from the Naval Academy in 1936 and served on the USS Lexington (CV-2), an aircraft carrier. He was stationed at Pearl Harbor Naval Base on board USS Tennessee (BB-43) as Chief Gunnery Officer, where he survived the Japanese bombing on December 7, 1941. He was then transferred to the USS Alabama (BB-60), a battleship. In July 1945 he was in charge of the 16-inch guns that bombarded Hitachi Steelworks. Due to his leadership, he was nominated personally by famous explorer and Rear Admiral Richard E. Byrd for a Bronze Star Medal. In September 1962, he was selected to be Commander Naval Forces Korea, having reached the rank of two-star Rear Admiral. In March 1964, he left Korea to direct a Navy Manpower Retention Task Force, studying ways to keep enlisted personnel from leaving service. Thereafter, he was made deputy commander of the Military Sea Transport Service before retiring in 1969. From 1971, Alford was the director of the Navy Marine Coast Guard Residence Foundation, a foundation for widows of naval officers and retirees. He died on December 17, 1988, from Pancreatic cancer. He is buried in Arlington National Cemetery, Arlington, VA.
