= John Alford (died 1691) =

English politician

John Alford (1 October 1645 – 16 May 1691) was an English politician who sat in the House of Commons in two periods between 1679 and 1690.

Alford was the son of Sir Edward Alford of Offington and his second wife Ann Corbet. His father died when he was aged eight. He was educated at Christ Church, Oxford and come into his inheritance of the Sussex estates at the age of 21.

In 1679, Alford was elected Member of Parliament for Midhurst and held the seat to 1681. In 1689 he was elected MP for Bramber and held the seat to 1690.

Alford died at Offington at the age of 44 and was buried at Broadwater.

Alford married Sarah and had three surviving children.
