= William VanMeter Alford Jr. =

American admiral

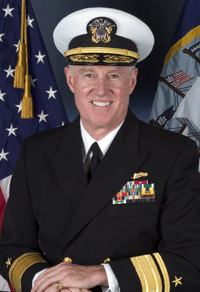
- RADM William VanMeter Alford Jr.
- Born: April 28, 1946 (age 80); Charlottesville, Virginia, United States
- Military career
- Allegiance: United States of America
- Branch: United States Navy
- Rank: Rear Admiral
- Conflicts: Vietnam War
- Awards: Navy Distinguished Service Medal; Defense Superior Service Medal; Legion of Merit (2)

Rear Admiral William VanMeter Alford Jr. (born April 28, 1946) is the former chief of staff for the United States Pacific Command between August 2004 and September 2007.

== Biography ==
He is a native of Charlottesville, Virginia, but was raised in Lexington, Kentucky. He received his Bachelor of Arts and Juris Doctor degrees from the University of Kentucky. Alford was commissioned through the Reserve Officer Candidate (ROC) program.

Following graduation and receipt of his commission from Officer Candidate School, Newport, Rhode Island, and attendance at several Navy schools in Charleston, South Carolina, he reported to the USS Reaper (MSO-467) homeported in Long Beach, California. He served as Operations, Communications and Mine Countermeasures Officer. Alford next served on board the USS Gridley as First Lieutenant and Antisubmarine Warfare Officer. While on board Reaper and Gridley, he deployed twice to Vietnam and participated in three Vietnam campaigns, Operation Market Time and Gulf of Tonkin Northern Search and Rescue operations.

In 1971 Alford was transferred to the Atlantic Fleet. He served as navigator and legal officer on board the USS Hermitage until June 1972. During that tour Hermitage served as command and control ship for the Exercise Snowy Beach LARC recovery effort.

Since his release from active duty in 1972, Alford has served as commanding officer of NR USS Kalamazoo; executive officer of NR USS Moinester; commanding officer of NR USS Biddle; executive officer of NR Commander Cruiser Destroyer Group Twelve; executive officer and commanding officer of NR Commander Sixth Fleet, Detachment 109; commanding officer of NR Supreme Allied Commander Atlantic, Detachment 109; as the first commanding officer of NR Commander Sixth Fleet, Detachment 802; EA and XO to the deputy commander, United States European Command; deputy commander, United States Sixth Fleet; and J3R, United States European Command (EUCOM).

During his tenure with Commander Cruiser Destroyer Group Twelve, Alford was chosen to serve as the United States Navy representative to the German Navy for Exocet missile testing and analysis, including live firing. During Desert Storm, Alford served as an assistant naval attaché, Tel Aviv, Israel. As the Sixth Fleet Detachment 802 commanding officer, Alford served as acting Sixth Fleet chief of staff for numerous theater-wide national, multi-national and NATO exercises, including Partnership for Peace exercises. Also during this command he served on active duty as the Sixth Fleet chief of staff, on board USS LaSalle, Gaeta, Italy, for a period of in excess of six months. During his tenure as the chief of staff, the Sixth Fleet conducted five non-combatant evacuations, served as the commander of three Joint Task Forces (two of them simultaneously), completed an historic Black Sea cruise and prepared the first battle plans for Kosovo operations.

In his capacity as deputy executive assistant/executive officer for the deputy commander, United States European Command, Stuttgart, Germany, Alford participated at length during Kosovo/Serbian Operations Allied Force, Allied Harbor and Joint Guardian, and as acting EA/XO for a prolonged period.

As deputy commander, United States Sixth Fleet, Gaeta, Italy, he participated in the planning for Operation Enduring Freedom as it pertains to the Sixth Fleet Area of Operations that includes the Mediterranean, the Black Sea, the Levant and Sub-Saharan Africa, in addition to his day-to-day operational duties. He was integral in the formation of JFMCC EUR for MIO and LIO operations in the theater and the theater wide classification of CCOI/COI. He has also served as Deputy Sixth Fleet/JFMCC for several EUCOM/NATO/Allied joint exercises.

As the J3R for the United States European Command, Alford was recalled to active duty for OEF and OIF. He facilitated the reorganization of the EUCOM staff into the European Planning and Operations Center for the execution of the EUCOM WOT and served as the deputy commander of the EPOC.

In August 2004, Alford was again recalled to active duty to serve as the United States Pacific Command chief of staff.

Alford served as a member of the Commander Naval Surface Reserve Force's Vision Division project and as a member of the Assistant Secretary of the Navy's (Reserve Affairs) white paper working group on the future of the Naval Reserve.

He has received the Navy Distinguished Service Medal, the Defense Superior Service Medal, the Legion of Merit (two awards), the Meritorious Service Medal, the Joint Service Commendation Medal (two awards) and the Navy and Marine Corps Commendation Medal, among other awards. He is the 2008 recipient of the Naval Reserve Association National Distinguished Service Award. RADM Alford completed the US Navy Executive Business Course, Haas School of Business, University of California - Berkeley.

- Navy Distinguished Service Medal
- Defense Superior Service Medal
- Legion of Merit with Gold Star
- Meritorious Service Medal
- Joint Service Commendation Medal with Gold Star
- Navy and Marine Corps Commendation Medal
