= John Alford (priest) =

John Richard Alford (21 June 1919 – 27 February 1995) was a Church of England priest. He was the Archdeacon of Halifax from 1972 to 1984.

Alford was educated at Fitzwilliam College, Cambridge and Ripon College Cuddesdon; and ordained in 1944. After curacies in Halifax and Wakefield he became a Tutor at Wells Theological College. He was Priest- Vicar of Wells Cathedral from 1950 to 1956; Vice-Principal of The Queen's College, Birmingham from 1956 to 1967; and Vicar of Shotwick from then until 1972.

Church of England titles
Preceded by John Lister	Archdeacon of Halifax; 1972–1984	Succeeded by Alan Chesters
