= John Alford (professor) =

John Alford (1686 – 29 September 1761) was the founder of the professorship of natural religion, moral philosophy, and civil polity in Harvard University.

Alford was a member of the council. He died at Charlestown, Massachusetts in 1761, aged 75. His executors determined the particular objects, to which his bequest for charitable uses should be applied, and divided it equally between Harvard, Princeton University, and the society for the propagation of the gospel among the Indians. To the latter US$10,675 was paid in 1787.

The town of Alford, Massachusetts, was named for him.

Levi Frisbie was the first Alford professor.

== Sources ==
1. Allen, William. An American Biographical and Historical Dictionary: Containing an Account of the Lives, Characters, and Writings of the Most Eminent Persons in North America From Its First Settlement, and a Summary of the History of the Several Colonies and of the United States. 2nd ed. Boston: Hyde, 1832.
