= Henry Alford (writer) =

American humorist and journalist

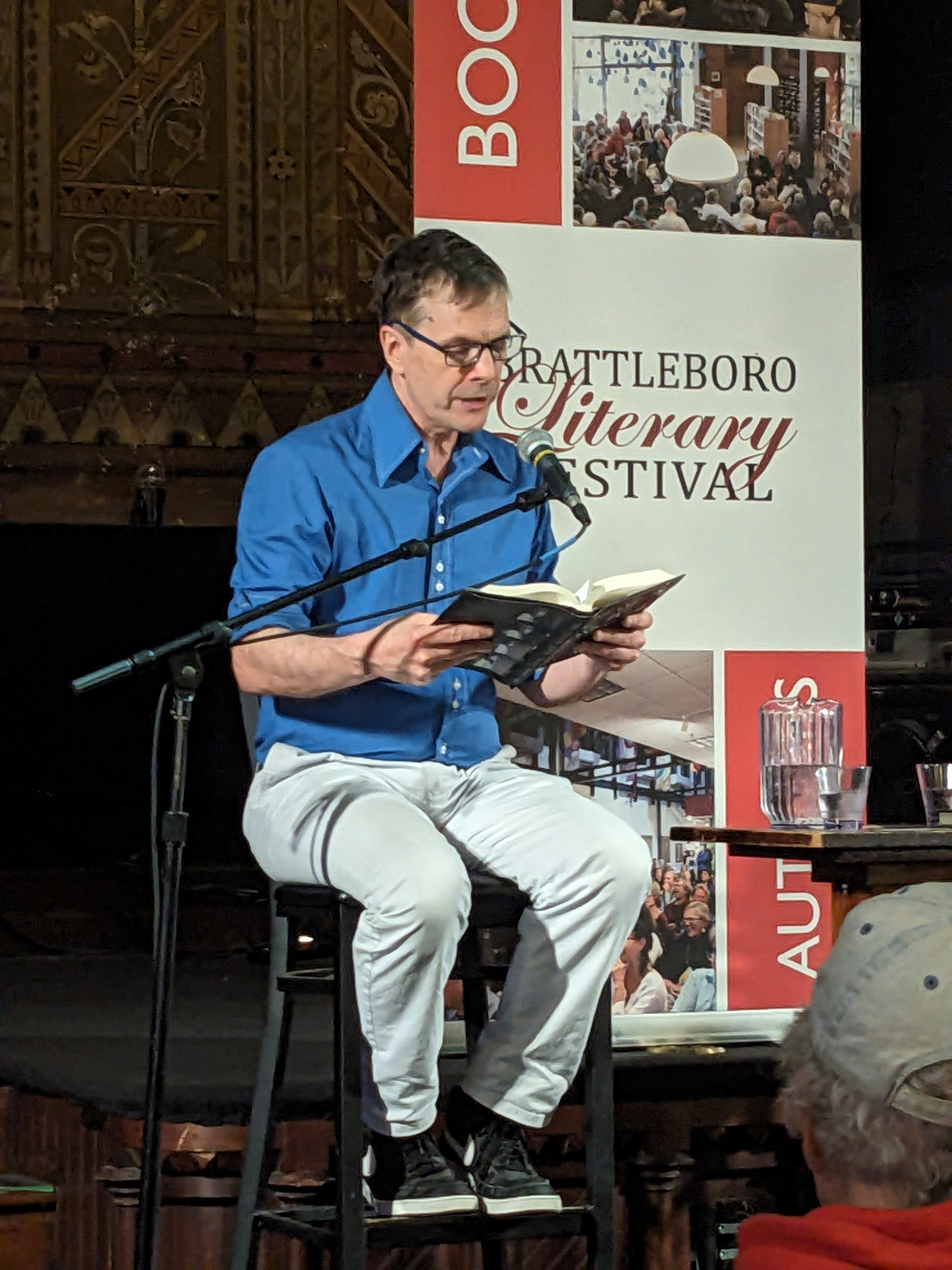
- at Brattleboro Literary Festival 2025
- Born: February 13, 1962 (age 64)
- Education: New York University
- Occupations: Humorist, journalist
- Writing career
- Notable works: Municipal Bondage, Big Kiss: One Actor's Desperate Attempt to Claw His Way to the Top, How to Live: A Search for Wisdom from Old People (While They are Still on This Earth), Would It Kill You To Stop Doing That?
- Notable awards: Thurber Prize for American Humor
- Website: henryalford.com

Henry Alford is a humorist and journalist who has written for The New Yorker magazine for more than two decades. He was previously a columnist for The New York Times and a contributing editor to Vanity Fair. He has written six books, including How to Live and Big Kiss, an account of his attempts to become a working actor, which won a Thurber Prize.

Sometimes called an "investigative humorist," Alford is primarily known for his first-person quests and exploits. These include creating a gourmet meal out of food purchased at a 99-Cent Store, eating at a nude restaurant in Paris with his boyfriend, inviting a restaurant health inspector to rate his apartment's kitchen while he was serving lunch to friends, and trying to pass the National Dog Groomers Association's certification test by applying lipstick to his cocker spaniel's snout and telling the test's judge, "I like a dog with a face."

His humor pieces for The New Yorker have included his imagining British taxi drivers reciting W.H. Auden's poetry to their passengers (which erroneously suggested citizens of the Northern city of York speak in the Cockney dialect) and a playlet composed entirely of Eugene O'Neill's stage directions. (Both are collected in the New Yorker's humor anthology, Disquiet Please, and the O'Neill playlet has been taught at M.I.T.) As a result of writing a 2005 article about fake words inserted in dictionaries for copyright purposes, he has been credited with coining the word "mountweazel."

He has contributed frequently to the Styles sections of The New York Times and to the New York Times Book Review, and written extensively about food and travel. His January 2013 article in the Travel section of The New York Times about Medellin, Colombia was referenced by Secretary of State Hillary Clinton during the Benghazi hearings.

== Early life ==
Alford was raised in Worcester, Massachusetts. He has painted a fairly rollicking portrait of his childhood; of his and his siblings' singing of Christmas carols in church, he wrote, "We can make 'Angels We Have Heard on High' sound like a scrum of Panzers." He began his college career at Bard College at Simon's Rock (then Simon's Rock College of Bard). Later, he transferred to New York University and worked as a casting director in the film industry for three years.

=== Spy Magazine ===
From 1988 to 1994, Alford wrote for Spy, the monthly satirical magazine edited and co-started by Graydon Carter and Kurt Andersen. He began by sending in articles and later earned a staff writer position. During his time at Spy, Alford contributed such pieces as "What if the Brontë Sisters Were a Heavy Metal Band?", "How Famous Actors Sold Themselves When They Were Trying to Become Famous," and "You'll Never Groom Dogs in This Town Again."

In Spy: The Funny Years, the magazine's 20th Anniversary history/anthology, Alford recounts how he was once told by Spy founder Kurt Andersen to "never curb your tendency to aphorize."

== Books ==
=== Municipal Bondage ===
Alford's first book, Municipal Bondage was published in February 1994 by Random House. A collection of essays and articles, many of which were previously featured in Spy and other magazines, the book documents Alford's adventurous exploration of modern urban living, including his hiring of two nude housecleaners, his trying to find work as an earlobe model, his volunteering to serve as the driver for the governor of Colorado during the 1992 Democratic Convention, and his untrained attempts to pass a variety of vocational exams.

In his review of Municipal Bondage for The New York Times Book Review, novelist Robert Plunket called Alford "...a classicist, firmly in the mold of Wilde, Waugh, Benchley, and Lebowitz."

=== Big Kiss ===
Big Kiss: One Actor's Desperate Attempt to Claw His Way to the Top is Alford's memoir of his attempt, at the age of 34, to become a professional actor. In it he chronicles his summer training session at The Royal Academy of Dramatic Art, playing an extra in the remake of Godzilla, his trip to improvisational comedy camp with his 69-year-old mother, his audition to voice Wilbur the Pig in Charlotte's Web, and his work on a phone-sex party line. The New York Times called the book "the definitive work on theatrical humiliation."

Alford found success in his new career when he was cast as the co-host of the VH1 show Rock of Ages. On the show, Alford interviewed groups of children and senior citizens as they viewed and analyzed current music videos and memorabilia from rock 'n roll history. In his review of the show, Joel Stein wrote in Time magazine that Alford "elicits lines from small children that Bill Cosby sweats whirlpools trying to score."

Big Kiss was also the genesis for an Off-Off Broadway show, "Big Kiss: An Evening of Humiliating Audition Stories." Co-produced and directed by his editor at Random House, Jonathan Karp, the show consisted of Alford and eight other actors performing self-written monologues about their most embarrassing audition experiences. Alford told John Tierney of The New York Times, "Once you call yourself a pathetic loser, you take that power away from others. You reclaim your pathos." Alford added, "Imagine if postal workers had an evening like this. We could save some lives."

=== How To Live ===
How To Live: A Search For Wisdom From Old People (While They Are Still On This Earth) documents Alford's journey to find and define the hard-won wisdom of the elderly. Early in the book, Alford describes the motivation behind his efforts: "If people are repositories of knowledge -- the death of an old person, an African saying runs, is like the burning of a library -- then I want a library card. I want borrowing privileges for the rest of my life."

Over the course of the book, Alford speaks with and visits a number of people over the age of seventy, some famous (playwright Edward Albee, actress Sylvia Miles, and literary critic Harold Bloom) and some offbeat (a Lutheran Pastor who thinks napping is a form of prayer; writer Sandra Tsing Loh's eccentric retired aerospace engineer father, who eats food out of the garbage), with the hopes that they might reveal some kind of sagacity that they have accrued over their lengthy lifespan.

When Alford asks his own mother, Ann, and step-father, Will, to reflect on what they've learned from their own experiences, he is the inadvertent catalyst to the couple's divorce. The book then follows Ann as she puts her wisdom on practical display, choosing to open a new chapter late in her life.

The book was named a Best Book of the Year by Publishers Weekly. Newsweek called Alford "the Socrates of dilettantes." Reviewer Alex Beam wrote in the New York Times Book Review that when Alford tried to pass off a 14-year-old cat as a wise individual, Beam wrote in the margin of his copy of How to Live, "Check, please!"

=== Would It Kill You To Stop Doing That? ===
Would It Kill You To Stop Doing That?: A Modern Guide To Manners is Alford's fourth book and was released on January 3, 2012. In the book, Alford acts as a tour guide for foreigners; travels to the manners capital of the world, Japan; and speaks with manners experts ranging from Miss Manners and Tim Gunn to a former prisoner and an army sergeant, all in the hopes of finding "ways we can treat each other better." The book was reviewed positively by The New York Times, Publishers Weekly, The Boston Globe, The Washington Post, and Salon.com.

=== And Then We Danced ===
Equal parts memoir and cultural history, And Then We Danced sees Alford tackling a variety of dance forms (ballet, hip hop, Zumba, jazz, ballroom, contact improvisation) while exploring the careers of luminaries ranging from Bob Fosse to George Balanchine, Twyla Tharp to Arthur Murray. The book was called "sublime" by Vanity Fair, "exhilarating" by Publishers Weekly, and was positively reviewed by ballerina Misty Copeland on the front page of the New York Times Book Review.

== Other works ==
=== Collages ===
Alford has written a number of fact-based humor articles in the style of collages. Their subject matter has included book acknowledgements, politician apologies, and bed and breakfast brochures.

=== Radio ===
Alford has contributed often to the public radio show "Studio 360"; his pieces include taking a former gang member to see the Broadway production of "West Side Story", starting his own artists colony, and creating a musical composition from the noises made by the radiator in his and others' apartments.

He has also been heard on "Fresh Air", "All Things Considered", and the now defunct The Next Big Thing.

== Personal life ==
Alford lives in New York City in a part of town he calls "the Adorable Restaurants district". He is openly gay.

Alford's website states that his love of waffles has "caused small children to call him Henry Alfun".

In an August 2011 Vanity Fair article about Facebook, in which Alford likened having a Facebook page to "curating a tiny museum of ambiguous friendship," Alford wrote that his Facebook friends include "Stupid Pet Tricks inventor Merrill Markoe, actresses Martha Plimpton and Sarah Thyre, the New Yorker's Rebecca Mead and Nancy Franklin" and 124 Greek priests.

Alford graduated from Eaglebrook School in Deerfield, Massachusetts, but was kicked out of the prestigious boarding school, Hotchkiss, at age 16.

On the occasion of being published in the New Yorker for the first time, Alford was told by his stepfather, "Thank God you're gay."

Alford has written about his late father's bon vivantism and alcoholism. (Alford's father, inebriated, once got in the backseat of the family car and, prepared to drive but sensing something was amiss, accused his wife of having stolen the steering wheel.) Alford's father once told his wife that he had a job in Stamford, Ct., but a year later Mrs. Alford discovered that her husband was unemployed and spending a lot of time in bars.

Alford is a self-described "lapsed Protestant agnostic."

== Other Writing ==
Alford has written for The New Yorker, The New York Times Magazine, Air Mail, GQ, New York, Details, Vogue, The Village Voice, Tin House, Oprah, Harper's Bazaar, McSweeney's, Publishers Weekly, Los Angeles Times, Bon Appetit, InStyle, TV Guide, The New York Observer, LA Weekly, San Francisco Chronicle, Allure, and Paris Review.

== Interviews ==
Alford has been a guest on The Tonight Show with Jay Leno once and Late Night with Conan O'Brien twice.

- "Talk of the Nation", January 17, 2012, "'Would It Kill You To Stop Doing That?' Rethinks Rude"
- The New York Times, April 12, 2000, "The Big City; Now Staging A Revival: Humiliation"
- Time Out New York, December 22, 2008, "Old Joy"
- Food Schmooze, October 13, 2010, "The Kitchen Cleanliness Test"
- Fresh Air, March 15, 1994, "Author Henry Alford"

== Bibliography ==
=== Books ===
- —— (1994). Municipal Bondage. New York: Random House. ISBN 978-0-679-41509-1. (Note: Library of Congress catalog has a 1993 copyright date.)
- —— (2000). Big kiss : one actor's desperate attempt to claw his way to the top. New York: Villard. ISBN 978-0-679-43873-1.
- —— (2009). How to live : a search for wisdom from old people (while they are still on this earth). New York: Twelve. ISBN 978-0-446-19603-1.
- —— (2012). Would it kill you to stop doing that? A modern guide to manners. New York: Twelve. ISBN 978-0-446-55766-5.
- —— (2018). And then we danced. New York: Simon and Schuster. ISBN 978-1-5011-2225-5.

=== Essays and reporting ===
- —— (August 10, 1998). "Shore leave". Shouts & Murmurs. The New Yorker.
- —— (September 1, 2014). "The kale diaries". Shouts & Murmurs. The New Yorker. Vol. 90, no. 25. p. 29.
- —— (May 25, 2015). "The view from the pit". The Talk of the Town. On the Job. The New Yorker. Vol. 91, no. 14. p. 27. (Note: Title in the online table of contents is "In the pit at 'The King and I'".)
- —— (June 20, 2016). "North Carolina police blotter". Shouts & Murmurs. The New Yorker. Vol. 92, no. 18. p. 33.
- —— (April 2, 2018). "Loose change". The Talk of the Town. Commerce Dept. The New Yorker. Vol. 94, no. 7. p. 29. (Note: Online version is titled "Do you take Sweatcoin?".)
- —— (September 17, 2018). "Waiter?". The Talk of the Town. Etiquette Dept. The New Yorker. Vol. 94, no. 28. p. 17. (Note: Online version is titled "Black napkins : the swanky-restaurant status symbol?".)
- —— (November 18, 2019). "Test drive". The Talk of the Town. Dept. of Hemlines. The New Yorker. Vol. 95, no. 36. pp. 22–23. (Note: Online version is titled "Adventures of a caftan-curious man".)
- —— (June 1, 2020). "Grim". The Talk of the Town. Scare Tactics. The New Yorker. 96 (15): 12–13. (Note: Online version is titled "Does the Grim Reaper wear sunscreen?".)
- —— (January 25, 2021). "Cocoon". The Talk of the Town. Test Drive Dept. The New Yorker. Vol. 96, no. 45. pp. 12–13. (Note: Online version is titled "Dressing for dinner when dinner is in a frigid curbside yurt".)
- —— (May 31, 2021). "Dumplings Behind Doors". The Talk of the Town. Dept. of Automation. The New Yorker. Vol. 97, no. 14. p. 17. (Note: Online version is titled "The Automat Returns, Pushing Dumplings into American Stomachs".)
- —— (September 6, 2021). "Naked Rebellion". The Talk of the Town. The Boards. The New Yorker. Vol. 97, no. 27. pp. 16–17. (Note: Online version is titled "Sophocles Gone Wild!".)

———————
