= George Muirhead (minister) =

Scottish minister (1764–1847)

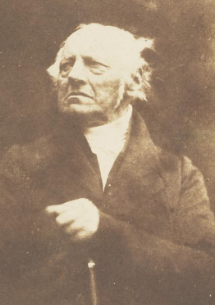
- George Muirhead by Hill & Adamson
- Church: Church of Scotland; Free Church

Personal details
- Born: 11 February 1764
- Died: 5 April 1847 (aged 83)

minister of Dysart (second charge)
- In office 4 September 1788 – 10 June 1807

minister of Dysart (first charge)
- In office 10 June 1807 – 24 October 1816

minister of Cramond
- In office 24 October 1816 – 1843

minister of Cramond Free Church
- In office 1843 – 5 April 1847

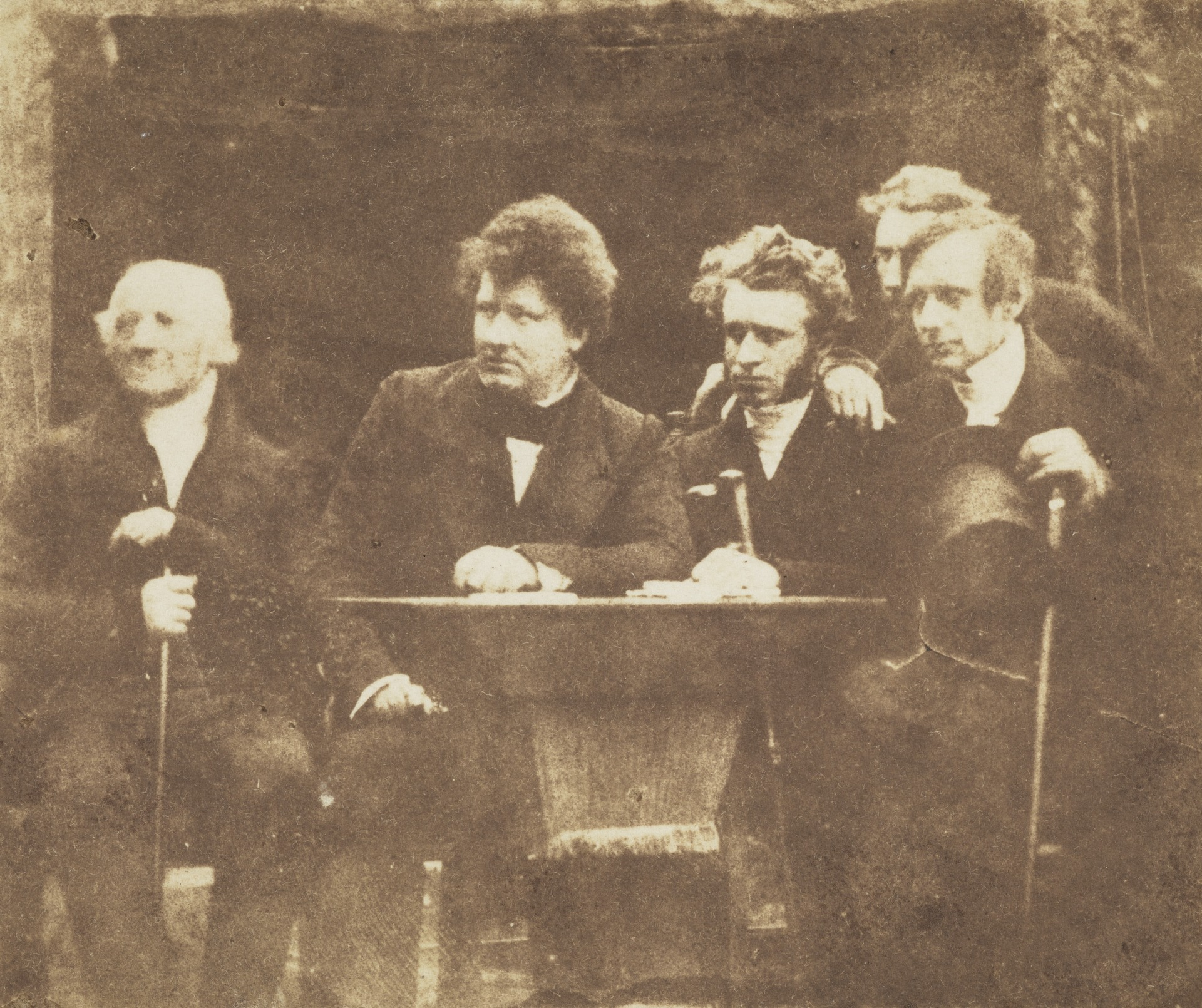
George Muirhead, William Cunningham, James Begg, John Hamilton and Thomas Guthrie

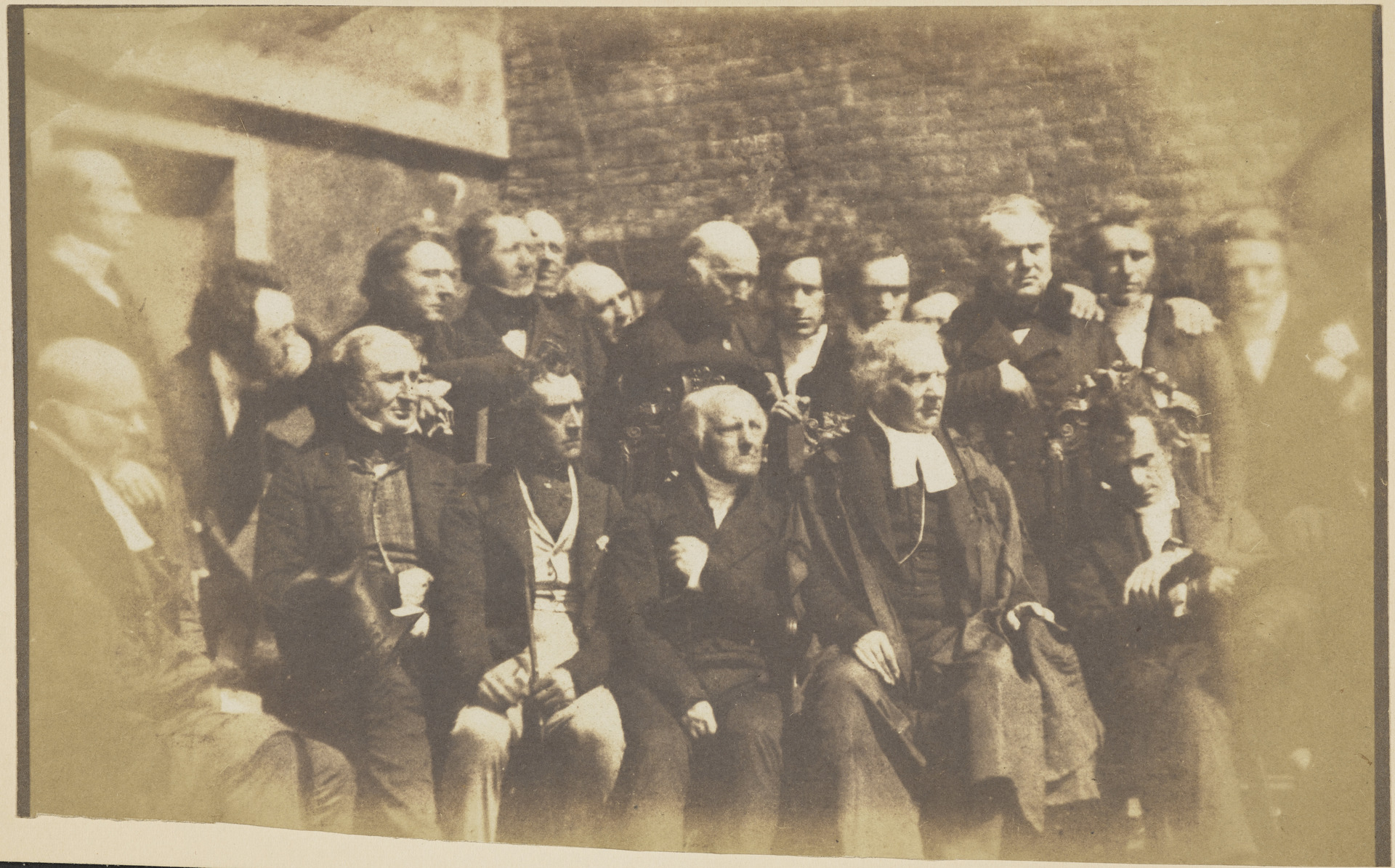
Edinburgh Presbytery: Seated, Patrick Clason, Alexander Earle Monteith, Robert Cunningham Graham Speirs, Rev. Dr George Muirhead, Thomas Chalmers, John Bruce; standing, Alexander Dunlop, Rev. Alexander Watson Brown, unknown man, Patrick Graham, unknown man, Alexander Fraser, Thomas Guthrie, perhaps Rev. Foggo, unknown man, Charles Chalmers, James Begg, Rev. James Fairbairn

George Muirhead (1764–1847) was a Scottish minister of the Church of Scotland who joined the Free Church of Scotland in his final years and was one of their senior ministers.

== Life ==
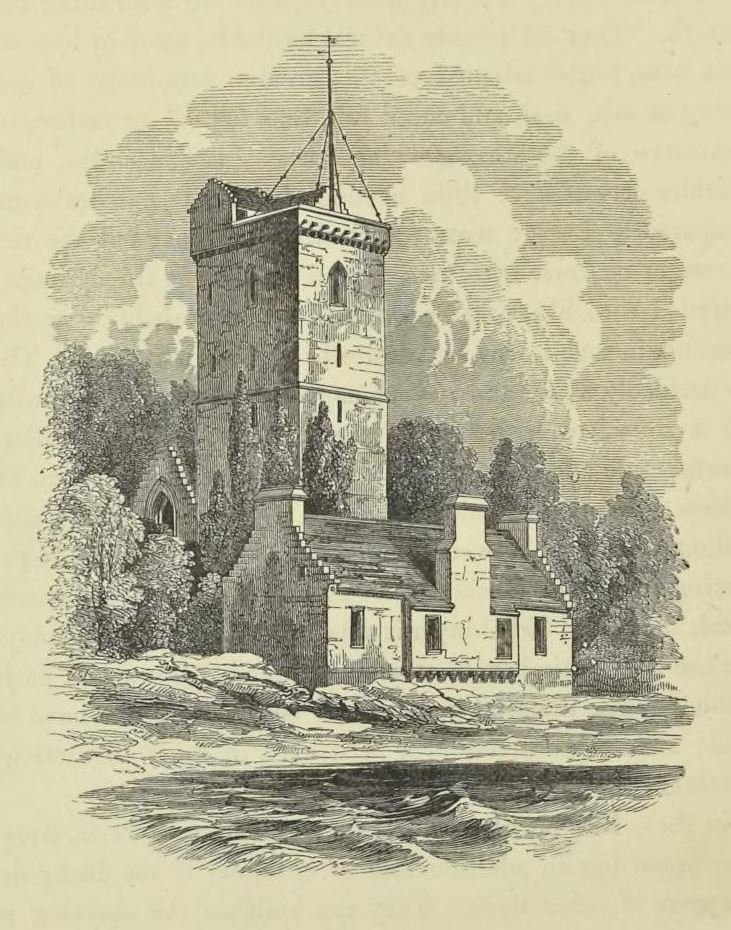
Dysart Church and manse

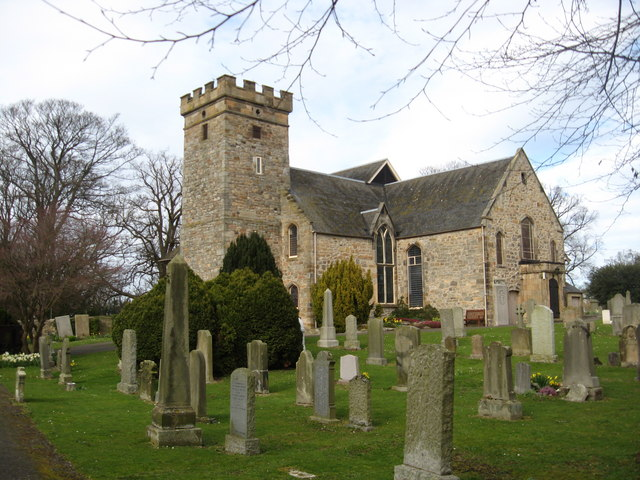
Cramond Kirk

He was born in the manse at Dysart, Fife in 1764 the second son of Patrick Muirhead, the parish minister, in a family of at least nine children. The church was remodelled in 1801 by Alexander Laing.

He studied at Glasgow University then at Divinity Hall in Edinburgh. He was ordained by the Church of Scotland in 1788 and was made second in charge at Dysart as assistant to his father. In 1811 he replaced has father as first in charge. In 1816 he was translated to Cramond Kirk on the north edge of Edinburgh replacing Rev Archibald Bonar.

In 1820 he is listed as a Governor of the Edinburgh Orphan Hospital.

In 1828 he commissioned the Edinburgh architect William Burn to remodel the church interior.

In the Disruption of 1843 he left the established church and joined the Free Church. As the oldest minister then present he was permitted to be the second to sign the Act of separation and Deed of Demission, immediately after the first signature of Thomas Chalmers.

Muirhead commissioned David Cousin immediately to design a new Cramond Free Church. This was sited to the south in Davidsons Mains.

The Free Church met in the old schoolhouse at Davidsons Mains. Muirhead preached until 1844 when he was replaced by Rev Alexander Campbell Fraser. A new church was rapidly built for the Free Church, also in Davidsons Mains and opened in December 1843. As the Free Church manse was not erected until 1857 it is unclear if Muirhead continued to live at Cramond manse.

He died in Cramond in 1847. He is buried in Cramond churchyard.

== Artistic recognition ==
He was photographed by Hill & Adamson in 1844.

== Family ==
In 1807 he married Maxwell Fleming (sic) (d.1854) daughter of Rev Dr Thomas Fleming DD of Lady Yester's Church in Edinburgh.

Their children included Rev Patrick Thomas Muirhead (1819-1888) minister of the Free Church in Kippen.

== Publications ==
- Sermon on the Death of Thomas Davidson DD (1827)
- Sermon on the Death of George Wright DD (1827)
