= Robert Cunningham Graham Speirs =

Scottish advocate and prison reformer (1797–1847)

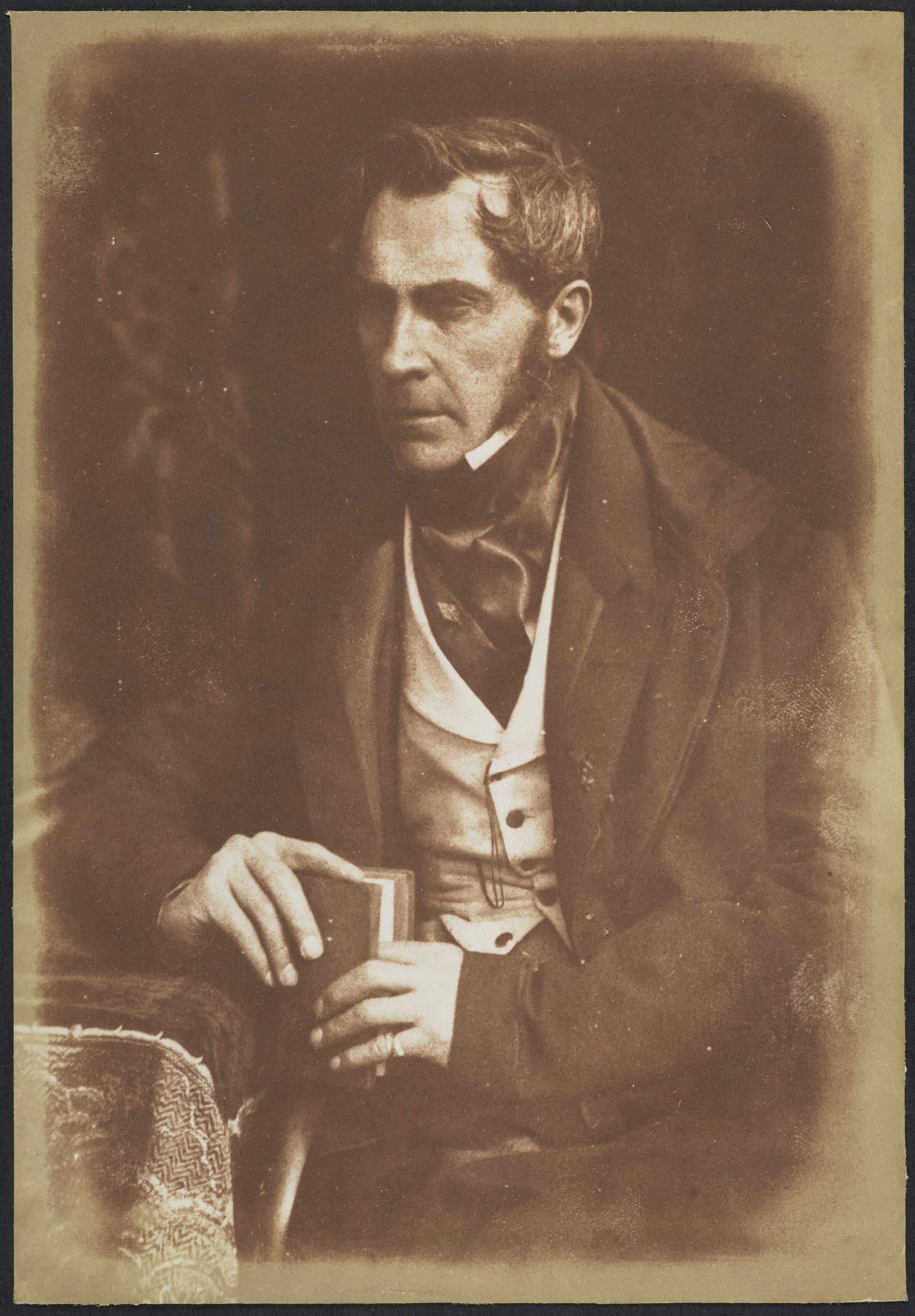
- Robert Cunningham Graham Speirs by Hill & Adamson

Personal details
- Born: 15 June 1797
- Died: 24 December 1847 (aged 50)

Sheriff of Elgin and Moray
- In office 1835–1840

Sheriff of Midlothian
- In office 1840–1847

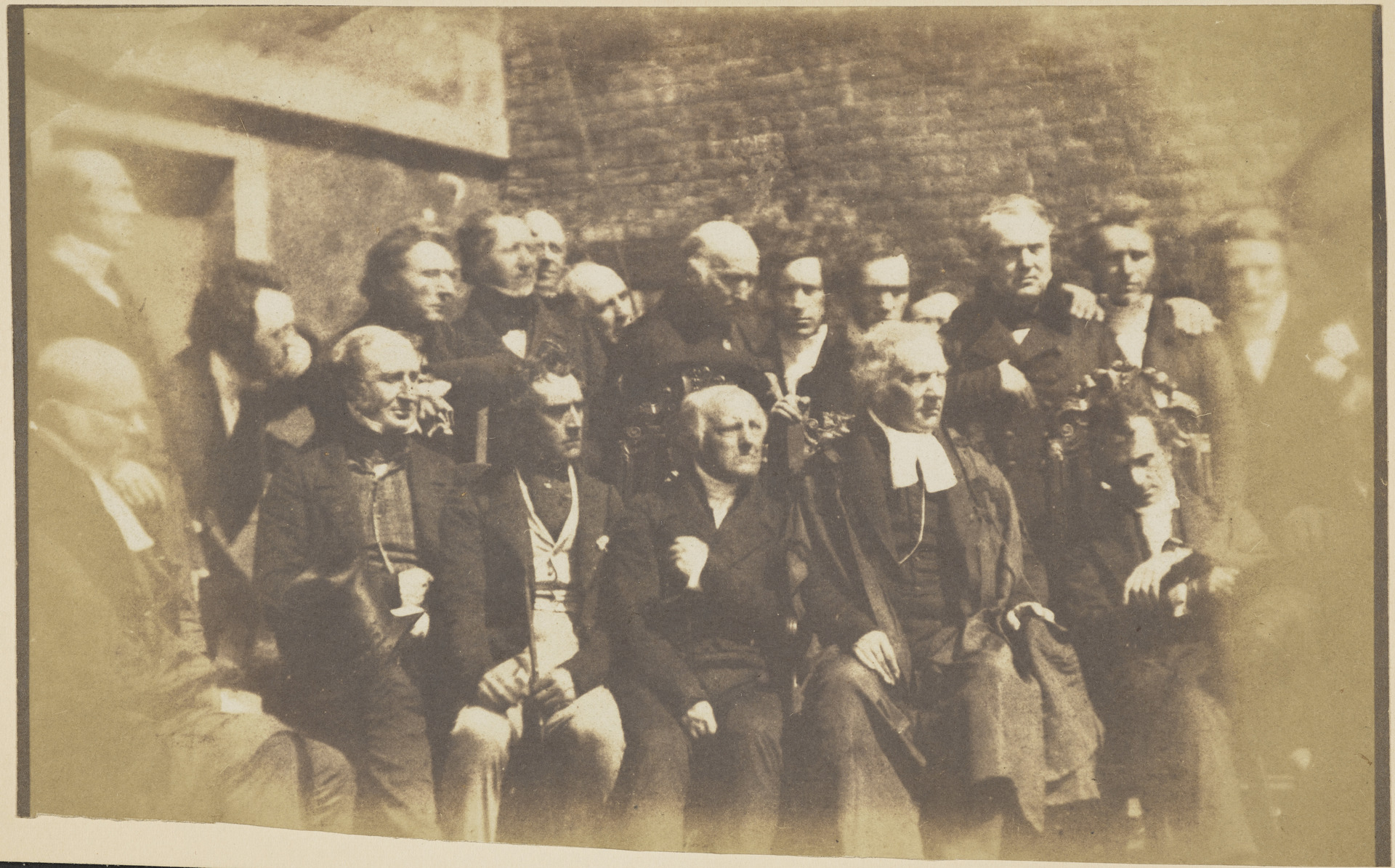
Edinburgh Presbytery: Seated, Patrick Clason, Alexander Earle Monteith, Robert Cunningham Graham Speirs, George Muirhead, Thomas Chalmers, John Bruce; standing, Alexander Dunlop, Rev. Alexander Watson Brown, unknown man, Patrick Graham, unknown man, Alexander Fraser, Thomas Guthrie, perhaps Rev. Foggo, unknown man, Charles Chalmers, James Begg, Rev. James Fairbairn

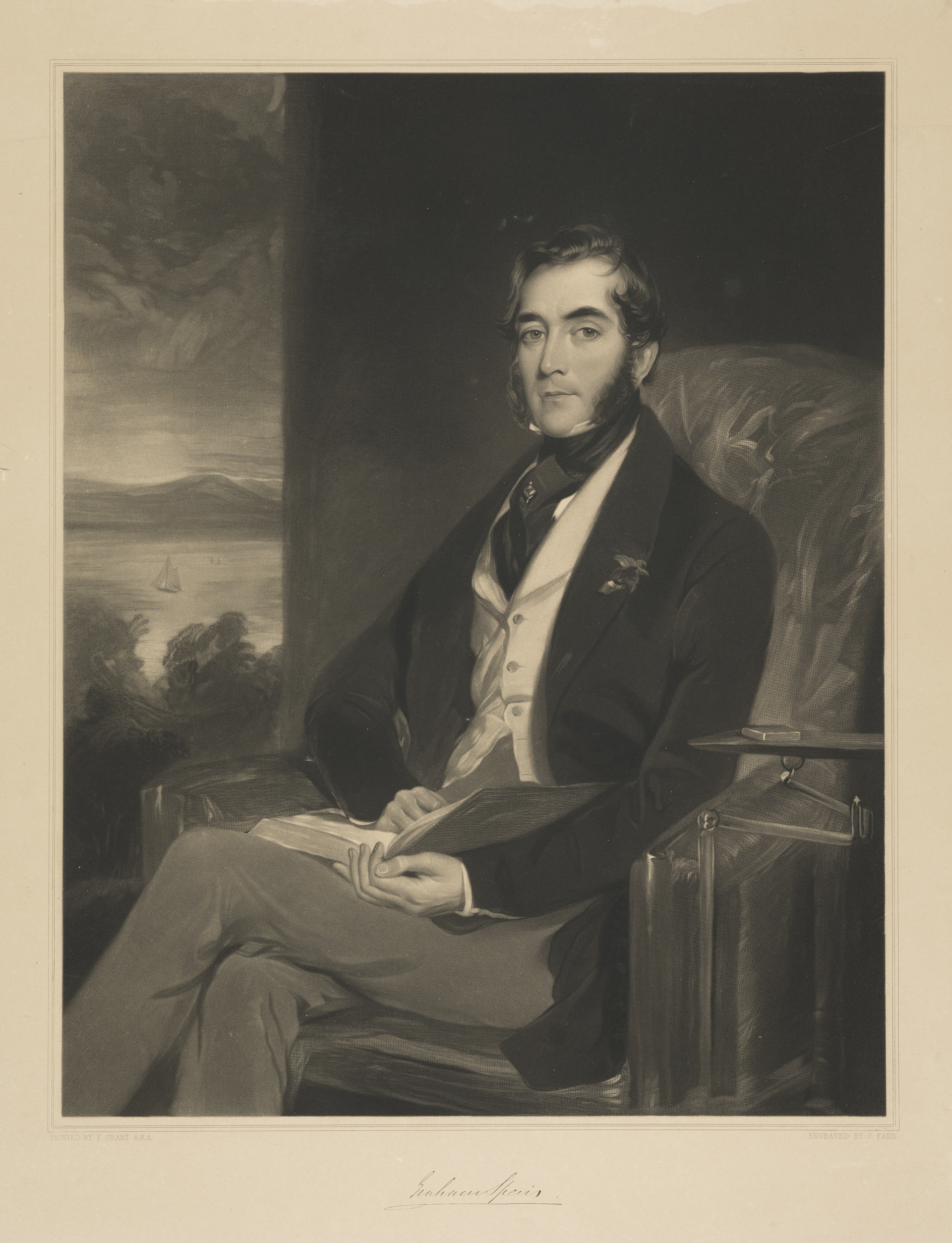
Graham Speirs by James Faed

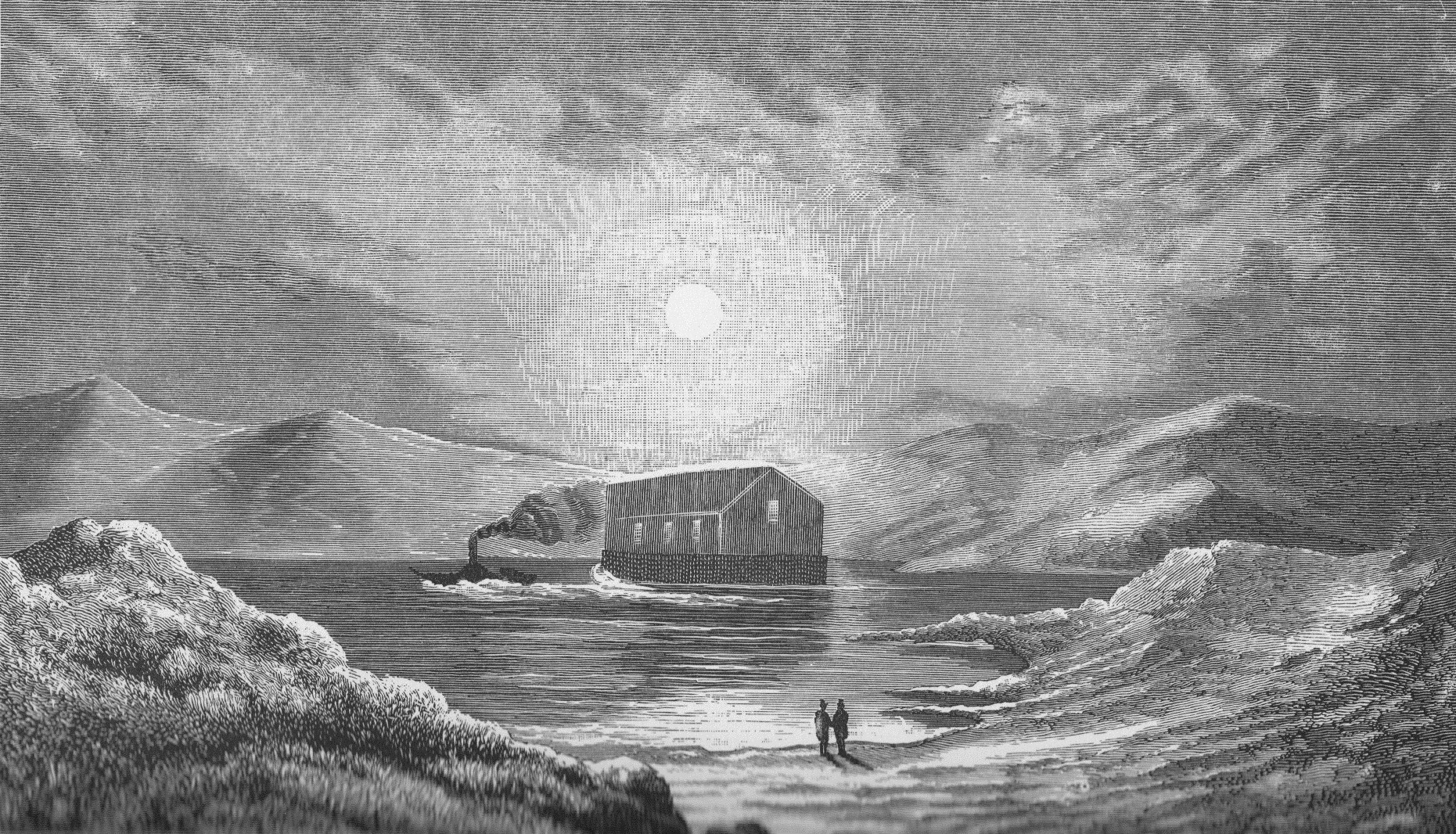
Towing the Iron Church into Loch Sunart. The iron church was a solution to the problem of Sites and Speirs, being head of the Sites Committee, paid for the floating church.

Robert Cunningham Graham Speirs or Spiers FRSE (1797–1847) was a 19th-century Scottish advocate and prison reformer. In later life he is largely referred to simply as Graham Speirs. He held the offices of Sheriff of Elgin and Moray from 1835 to 1840 and subsequently was Sheriff of Midlothian from 1840 until his death in 1847. He joined the Free Church at the Disruption of 1843. He was then involved in the Sites Committee trying to persuade landowners to allow the denomination to build churches and schools on their land.

== Early life and career ==
Robert Cunningham Graham Speirs was born on 15 June 1797. He was the second son of Peter Speirs of Culcreuch, founder owner of a Mill at Fintry and his wife Martha Harriet Graham, daughter of Robert Cunninghame Graham of Gartmore (1735–1797) near Lake of Menteith. His early education was conducted partly at the High School of Edinburgh, and partly at a school in Warwickshire, where he remained until December 1811. He then entered the Royal Navy, and continued in the Naval Service for five years, when, directing his attention to the study of law, he was called to the Bar of Scotland in 1820.

== Roles as sheriff ==
His professional career was distinguished by steady but not rapid progress. In 1830, Lord Advocate Jeffrey appointed Speirs an advocate-depute, and soon afterwards Speirs was appointed sheriff of Elgin and Nairn. Subsequently, in 1840, on a vacancy occurring in the metropolitan sheriffdom, he was offered and accepted the office of sheriff of Edinburgh, which he held until his death. He was thus, for a time at least, removed from practice at the bar.

In 1835 he became Sheriff of Elgin. In 1840 he became Sheriff of Edinburgh and remained in that role until his death.

== Church of Scotland elder ==
Preceding the Disruption of 1843, at the time of the Convocation of ministers which preceded the Assembly of 1843, when it was thought right that the laymen attached to the principles then upheld by the majority of the Assembly, and especially the eldership, should come forward and at once strengthen the hands of the ministers, and provide means for their sustentation on the Disruption taking place. The meeting of the eldership occurred on the 1st February 1843. It was mentioned at the time in the Witness newspaper. Speirs proposed the first resolution, and in doing so he is reported to have represented the Church of Scotland "as she has existed since the Reformation, as by far, he would venture to say, without any comparison whatever, the cheapest institution for good government that ever any nation had to boast of;" and to have been affected even to tears when he uttered the words, "I cannot look forward without dismay to the prospect of the Disruption of the Church of Scotland," which he so characterised and loved. The Committee formed at this meeting was united to another appointed by the Convocation, under the auspices of Thomas Chalmers. This body, organised under the title of the "Provisional Committee," held its first meeting the following day; and to its labours the Free Church mainly owes the organisation, by which the days of the Disruption were characterised. This is explained in Dr Chalmers' Life and Correspondence by William Hanna.

== Free Church roles ==
In the Disruption of 1843 he is listed as one of the church elders who left the Church of Scotland to join the Free Church of Scotland. Speirs heading up the Sites Committee set up because landlords across the country refused to give sites for the Free Church to build churches and schools.

A renewed application to Parliament was made in the spring of 1847, and a select Committee was then appointed to inquire in what parts of Scotland, and under what circumstances, sites had been refused. A great deal of evidence was laid before the committee, and, amongst others, Thomas Chalmers, and Graham Speirs, as Convener of the Sites Committee, were especially under examination.

It was reported to the House of Commons, was that the Committee held it to be proved that there were a number of Christian congregations in Scotland who have no place of worship within a reasonable distance of their home, where they can unite in the public service of Almighty God, according to their conscientious convictions of religious duty, under convenient shelter from the severity of a northern climate. And the Committee farther reported to the House that they had heard with pleasure, in course of the evidence, that concessions had been made and sites granted; and they expressed an earnest hope that those which have hitherto been refused may no longer be withheld.

At the Assembly in 1846 Speirs gave voice to the fear that proprietors were "sending away or ejecting the Free Church population, in order that they may in that way take away the pretext for asking sites". Sheriff Speirs had by this time produced at least a partial answer in the shape of an iron floating church, or churches — for he set no limit on the number which might be produced. Addressing the Commission of the Free Assembly in November 1845, he revealed that he had placed a contract with Mr John Wood of Port Glasgow for an iron church capable of containing 700 sitters. No destination had yet been fixed on for it though in the course of his speech Kilmalie, Strachur and Lochcarron were mentioned as suitable. After delays one was completed and towed into place in Loch Sunart near Strontian starting on Wednesday 8 July 1846. At the cost of slight inconvenience to the congregation, a mooring was chosen below the township of Ardnastang, in the bay of Eilean a’Mhuirich, about 1.25 miles west of Strontian.

== Other interests ==
Speirs had other interests besides the law and the church. In connection, with Prison reformation and discipline, he was an active member of the society formed in 1835 on that subject, which by its efforts materially contributed to the enactment of 1839, by which the jails of Scotland, once described as "nurseries of vice and crime," became placed in a more satisfactory condition. In this work his associates were men of all classes and denominations — Dr Kaye Greville, John Wigham junior, Dr David Maclagan, Mr George Forbes, and other like-minded citizens. Afterwards under the Statute as chairman of the Edinburgh Prison Board, and as member of the General Board of Prisons in Scotland, Speirs was in a position to give his aid in carrying through this national reform. In defence of the observance of the Sabbath, the establishment of Ragged Schools, and in the cause generally of education, he was also engaged. In 1841 he was elected a Fellow of the Royal Society of Edinburgh. His proposer was David Welsh.

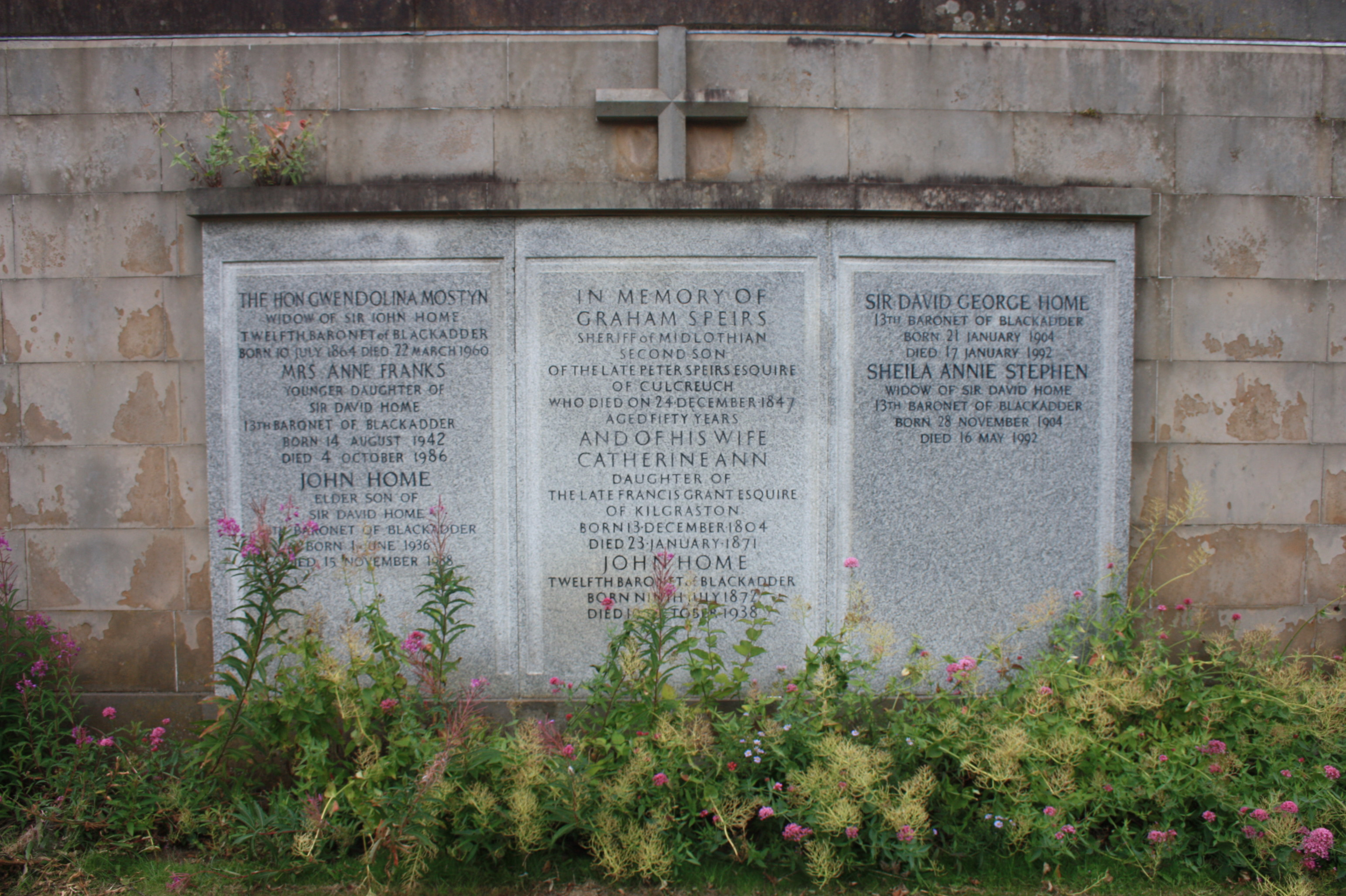
The grave of Robert Cunningham Graham Spiers, Grange Cemetery, Edinburgh

== Death and legacy ==
He lived his final years at Granton House in north Edinburgh. A salt print photograph of him was taken by Hill & Adamson around 1845, in the early years of photography. He died on Christmas Eve, 24 December 1847. and is buried in Grange Cemetery in south Edinburgh. The grave lies in the centre of the north wall.

Ritchie suggest that Speirs's legacy to the Free Church was threefold. As was constantly emphasised, by birth he came from among the best families in the land. This was reinforced by the social connections he made to other gentry families from his schooldays, through his naval service, when called to the bar and through marriage. Previously, it had been characteristic of seceding churches that their adherents came from the more humble ranks of Scottish society.

While the Free Church could glory in its ministers, with men of the calibre of Chalmers, Cunningham, Candlish and Guthrie, Speirs made it clear that the church's moral authority was not restricted to its ministry. There was a powerful eldership as well and this was a strong consideration as the Free Church sought the moral high ground in its relations with the Church of Scotland.

There was also the practical aid Speirs had given through his service to the sites committee. By the time of his death the sites issue was not resolved, but it was clear that the trend of events was moving in a direction he would favour. The mixture of skilled advocacy and patient negotiation was bearing fruit. In parallel with that policy Speirs had acted decisively to win the propaganda battle, through the construction of an iron floating church and by the lithographs he commissioned of scenes of site-refusal.

== Family ==
In 1820 he married Catherine Ann Grant (1804-1871) daughter of Francis Grant of Kilgraston (see grave), and left a daughter, Anne Oliphant Speirs (1833 - 1907), who married George Home of Blackadder and inherited Culcreuch Castle, which she sold in 1890, from her uncle. Speirs lived at a very large Georgian town house at 46 Great King Street.
