= Disruption of 1843 =

Schism within the Church of Scotland

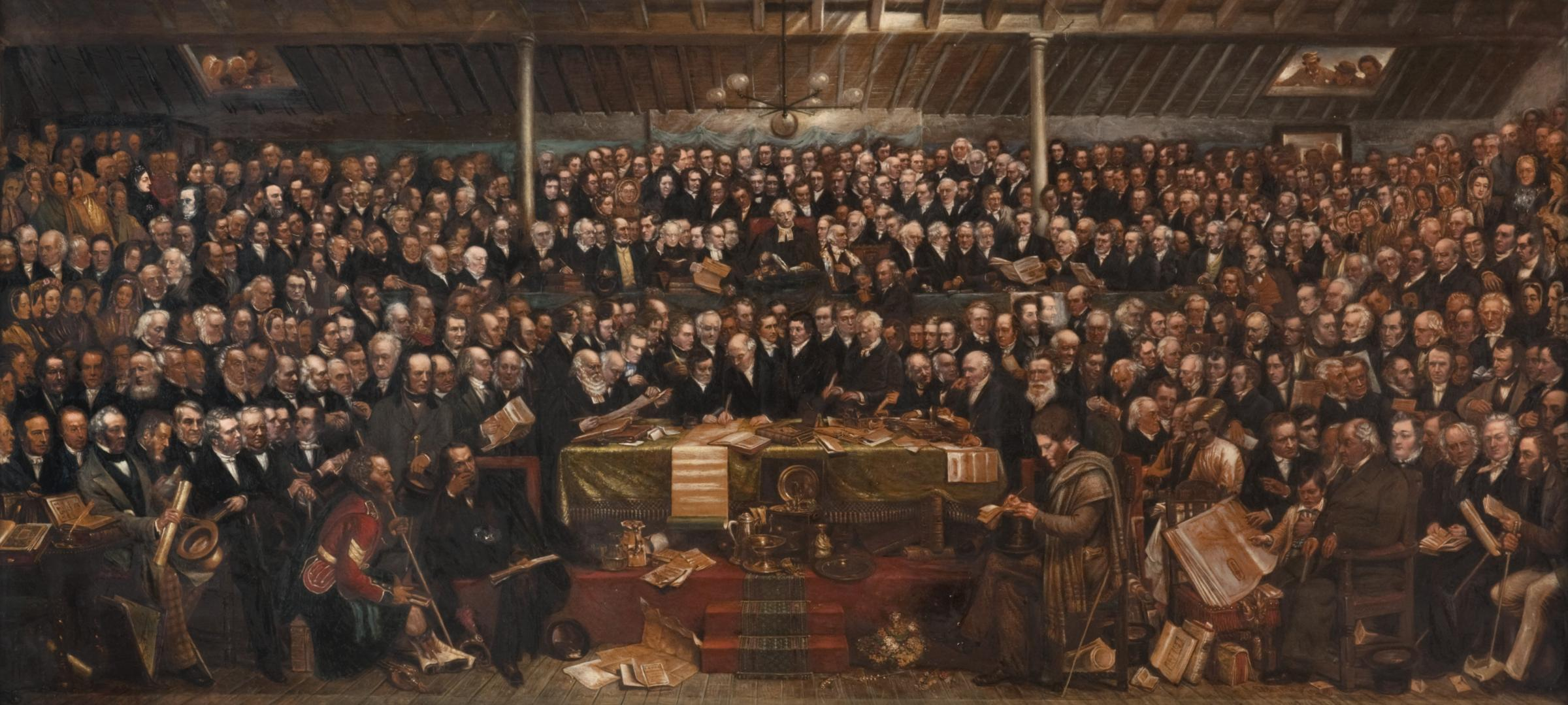
The Disruption Assembly by David Octavius Hill

Disruption brooch showing the graves of Andrew Melville, John Knox, David Welsh, James Renwick, and Alexander Henderson. Chalmers, Dunlop and Candlish are also mentioned.

The Disruption of 1843, also known as the Great Disruption, was a schism in 1843 in which 450 evangelical ministers broke away from the Church of Scotland to form the Free Church of Scotland. The main conflict was over whether the Church of Scotland or the British Government had the power to control clerical positions and benefits. The Disruption came at the end of a bitter conflict within the Church of Scotland, and had major effects in the church and upon Scottish civic life.

== The patronage issue ==
The Church of Scotland was recognised by Acts of the Parliament as the national church of the Scottish people. Particularly under John Knox and later Andrew Melville, the Church of Scotland had always claimed an inherent right to exercise independent spiritual jurisdiction over its own affairs. To some extent, this right was recognised by the Claim of Right of 1689, which ended royal and parliamentary interference in the order and worship of the church. It was ratified by the Act of Union in 1707.

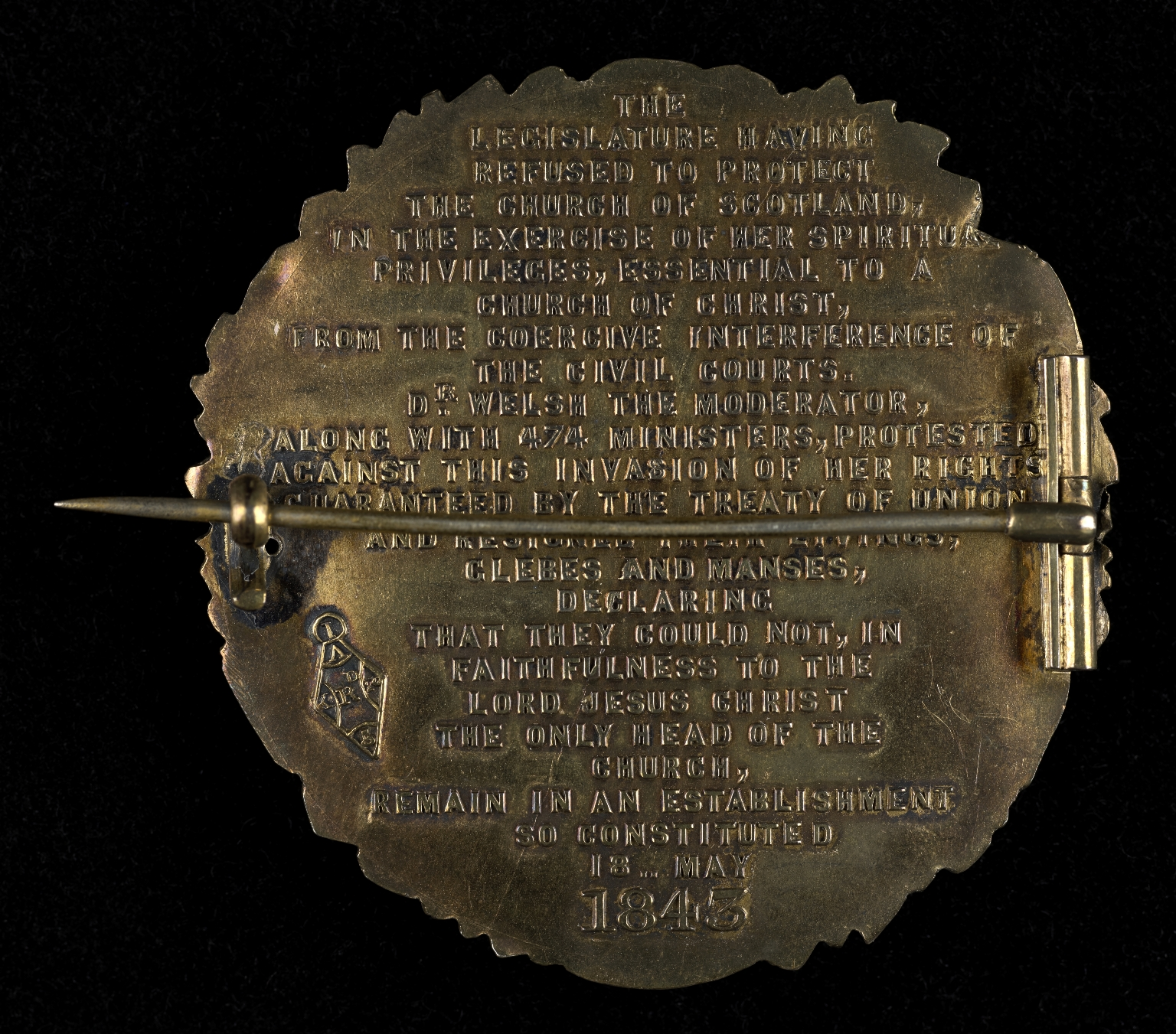
Disruption Brooch. Back side.

On the other hand, the right of patronage, in which the patron of a parish had the right to install a minister of his choice, became a point of contention. Many church members believed that this right infringed on the spiritual independence of the church. Others felt that this right was a property of the state. As early as 1712 the right of patronage had been restored in Scotland, amid remonstrances from the church. For many years afterwards, the church's General Assembly tried to reform this practice. However the dominant Moderate Party in the church blocked reform out of fear of conflict with the British Government.

== The "Ten Years' Conflict" ==
=== Veto Act ===
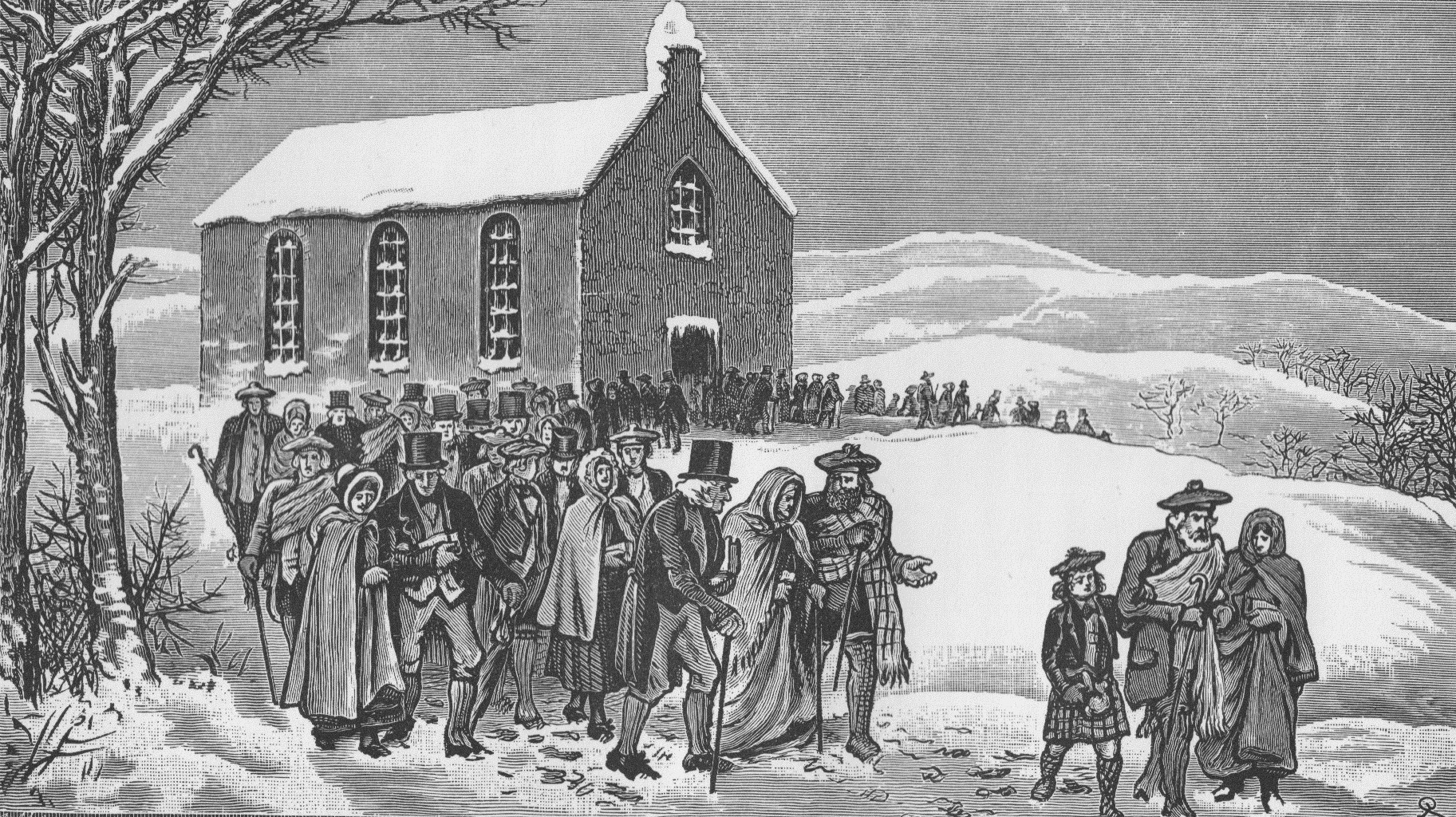
Parishioners walk out of church in protest at the unpopular appointment of a minister in the parish of Marnoch, Strathbogie in 1841

In 1834, the evangelical party attained a majority in the General Assembly for the first time in 100 years. One of their actions was to pass the Veto Act, which gave parishioners the right to reject a minister nominated by their patron. The Veto Act was to prevent the intrusion of ministers on unwilling parishioners, and to restore the importance of the congregational "call". However, it served to polarise positions in the church, and set it on a collision course with the government.

The first test of the Veto Act came with the Auchterarder case of 1834. The parish of Auchterarder unanimously rejected the patron's nominee – and the Presbytery refused to proceed with his ordination and induction. The nominee, Robert Young, appealed to the Court of Session. In 1838, by an 8–5 majority, the court held that in passing the Veto Act, the church had acted ultra vires (beyond its delegated authority), and had infringed the statutory rights of patrons. It also ruled Church of Scotland was a creation of the state and derived its legitimacy from act of Parliament.

The Auchterarder ruling contradicted the Scottish church's Confession of Faith. As Burleigh puts it: "The notion of the Church as an independent community governed by its own officers and capable of entering into a compact with the state was repudiated" (p. 342). An appeal to the House of Lords was rejected.

=== Further conflicts ===
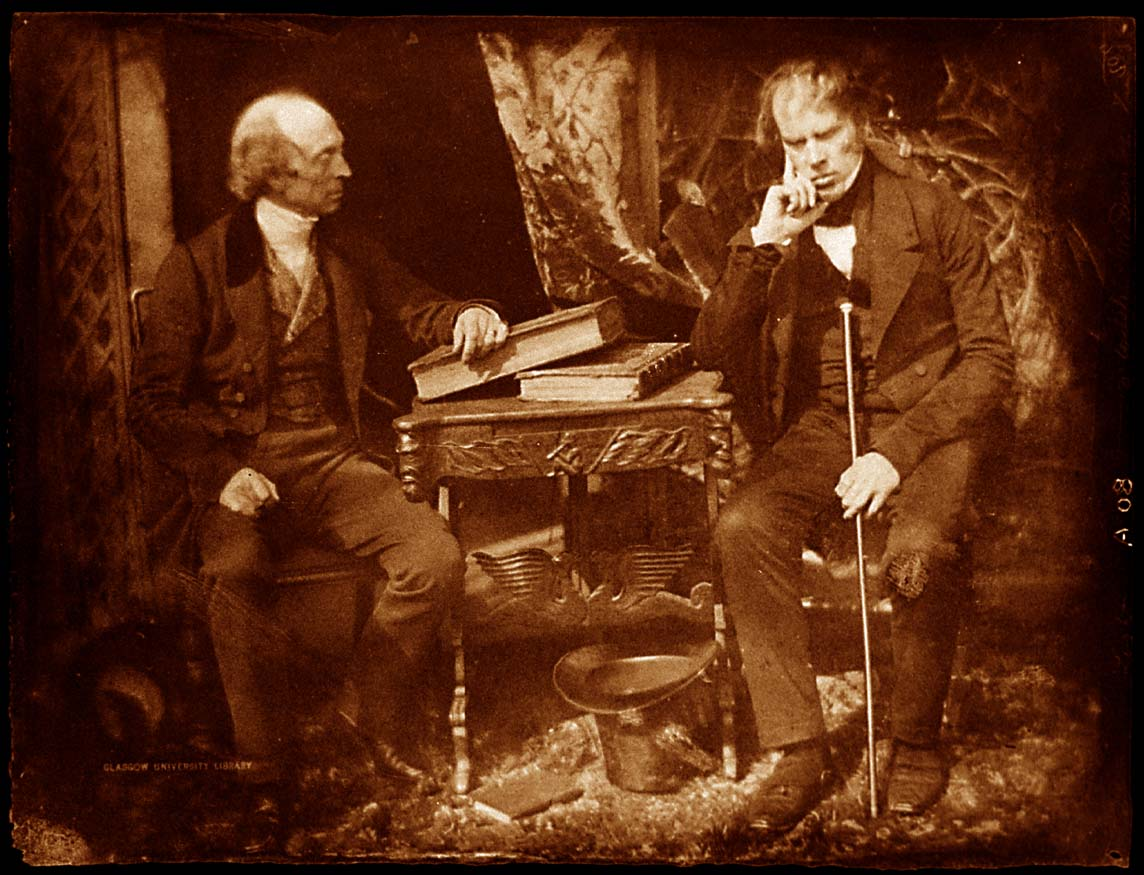
Mr Dunlop and David Welsh by Hill & Adamson. Dunlop wrote a memoir of Welsh.

In a second case, the Court of Session summoned the Presbytery of Dunkeld for proceeding with an ordination despite a court interdict. In 1839, the General Assembly suspended seven ministers from Strathbogie for proceeding with an induction in Marnoch in defiance of its orders. In 1841, the seven Strathbogie ministers were deposed for acknowledging the superiority of the secular court in spiritual matters.

The evangelical party later presented to parliament a Claim, Declaration and Protest Anent the Encroachments of the Court of Session. The claim recognised the jurisdiction of the civil courts over the endowments that the government gave to the Scottish church. This "The Claim of Right" was drawn up by Alexander Murray Dunlop. However, the claim resolved that the church give up these endowments rather than see the 'Crown Rights of the Redeemer' (i.e. the spiritual independence of the church) compromised. This claim was rejected by parliament in January 1843, leading to the Disruption in May.

== The Disruption ==
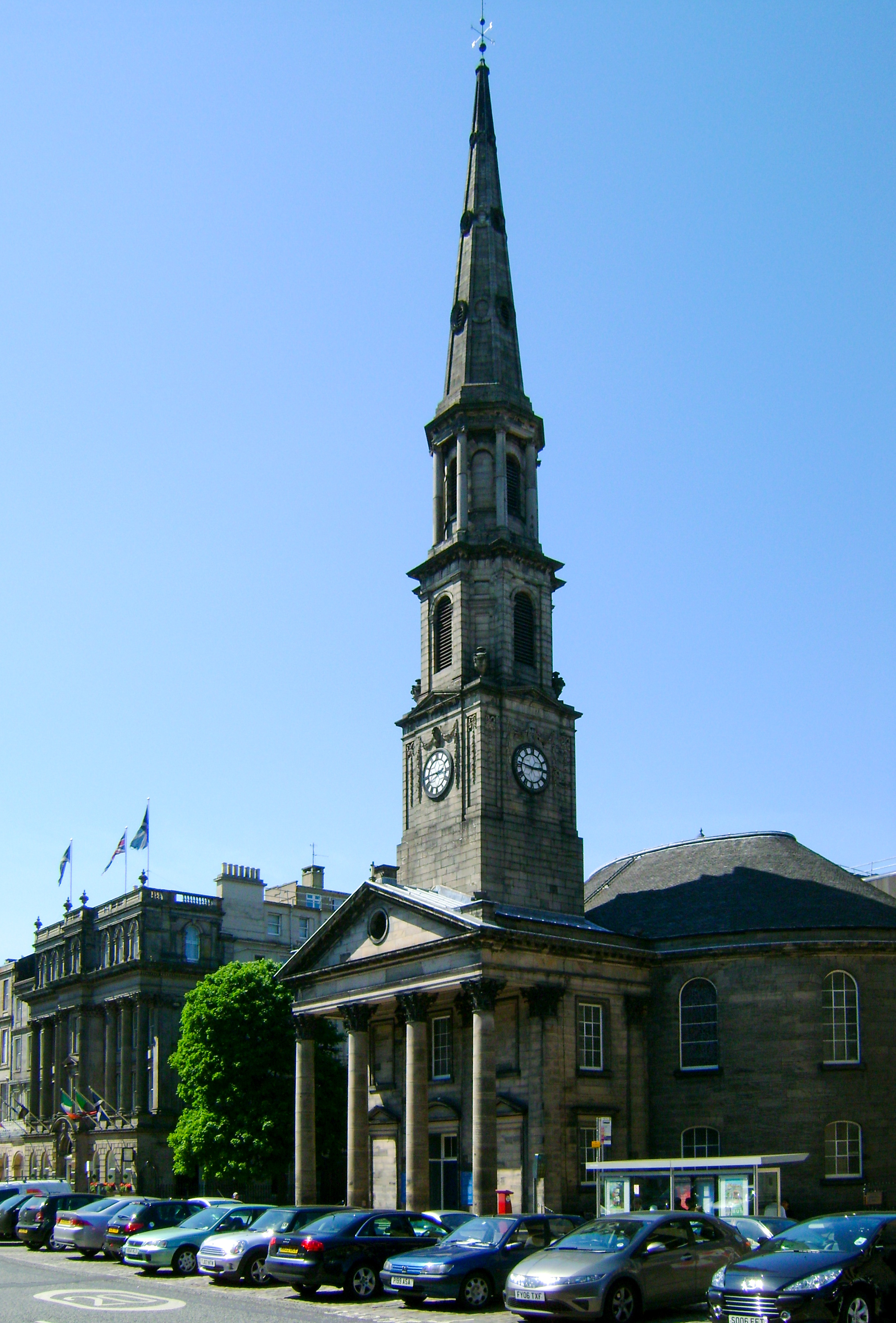
St Andrew's Church, Edinburgh, scene of the Disruption

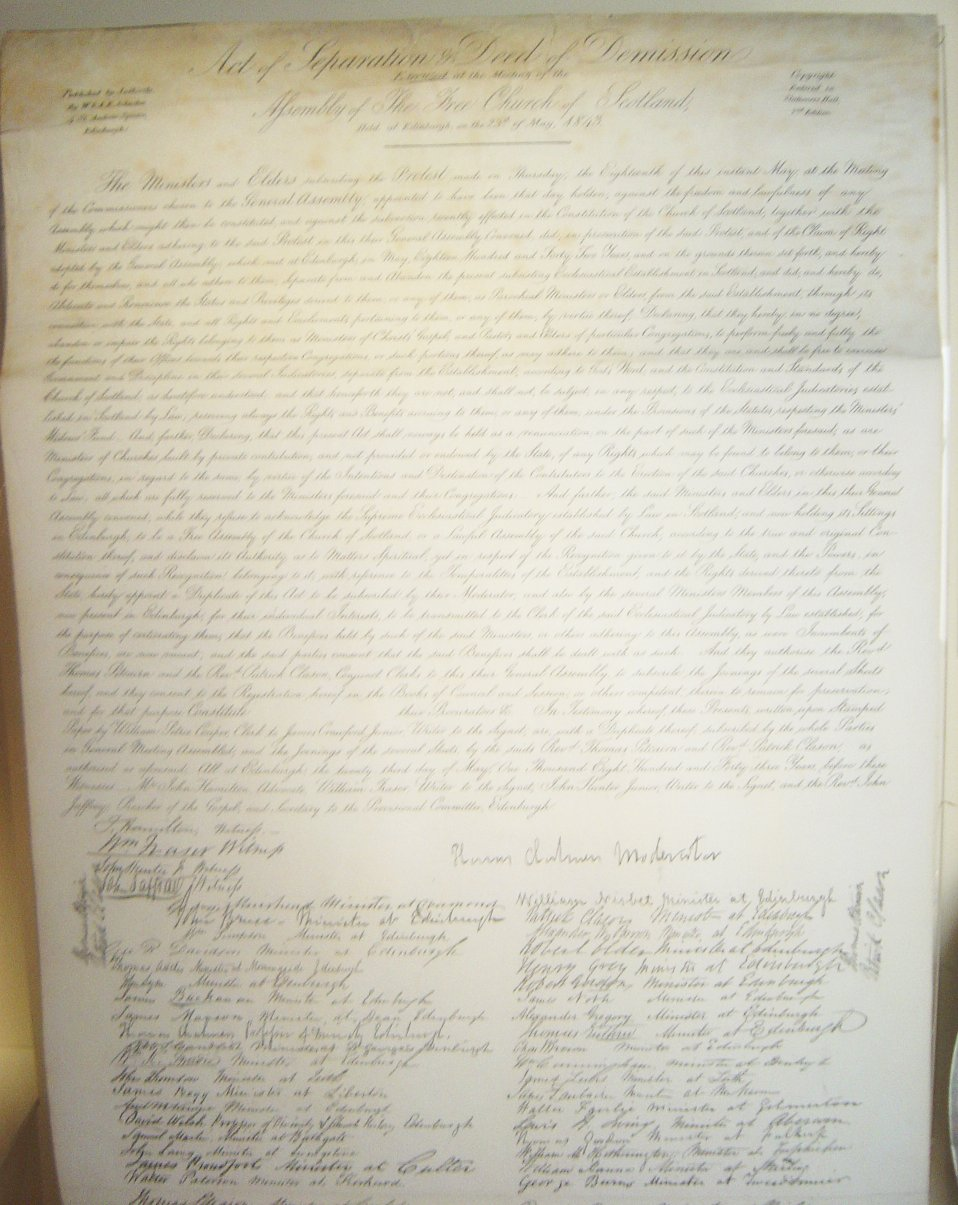
The 1843 deed of demission

On 18 May 1843, 121 ministers and 73 elders led by David Welsh met at the Church of St Andrew in George Street, Edinburgh. After Welsh read a Protest, the group left St. Andrews and walked down the hill to the Tanfield Hall at Canonmills. There they held the first meeting of the Free Church of Scotland, the Disruption Assembly. Thomas Chalmers was appointed the first Moderator. On 23 May, a second meeting was held for the signing of the Act of Separation by the ministers. Eventually, 474 of about 1,200 ministers left the Church of Scotland for the Free Church.

In leaving the established church, however, they did not reject the principle of establishment. As Chalmers declared: "Though we quit the Establishment, we go out on the Establishment principle; we quit a vitiated Establishment but would rejoice in returning to a pure one. We are advocates for a national recognition of religion – and we are not voluntaries."

Perhaps a third of the evangelicals, the "middle party", remained within the established church – wishing to preserve its unity. However, for those who left, the issue was clear. It was not the democratising of the church (although concern with power for ordinary people was a movement sweeping Europe at the time), but whether the Church was sovereign within its own domain. The body of the church reflecting Jesus Christ, not the monarch nor Parliament, was to be its head. The Disruption was basically a spiritual phenomenon – and for its proponents it stood in a direct line with the Reformation and the National Covenants.

Splitting the church had major implications. Those who left forfeited livings, manses and pulpits, and had, without the aid of the establishment, to found and finance a national church from scratch. This was done with remarkable energy, zeal and sacrifice. Another implication was that the church they left was more tolerant of a wider range of doctrinal views.

There was also the issue of needing to train its clergy, resulting in the establishment of New College, with Chalmers appointed as its first principal. It was founded as an institution to educate future ministers and the Scottish leadership, who would in turn guide the moral and religious lives of the Scottish people. New College opened its doors to 168 students in November 1843, including about 100 students who had begun their theological studies before the Disruption.

Most of the principles on which the protestors went out were conceded by Parliament by 1929, clearing the way for the re-union of that year, but the Church of Scotland never fully regained its position after the division.

=== Photographic portraiture ===
The painter David Octavius Hill was present at the Disruption Assembly and decided to record the scene. He received encouragement from another spectator, the physicist Sir David Brewster who suggested using the new invention, photography, to get likenesses of all the ministers present, and introduced Hill to the photographer Robert Adamson. Subsequently, a series of photographs were taken of those who had been present, and the 5-foot × 11-foot 4 inches (1.53 m × 3.45 m) painting was eventually completed in 1866. The partnership that developed between Hill and Adamson pioneered the art of photography in Scotland. The painting predominantly features the ministers involved in the Disruption but Hill also included many other men – and some women – who were involved in the establishment of the Free Church. The painting depicts 457 people of the 1500 or so who were present at the assembly on 23 May 1843.

== Gallery ==
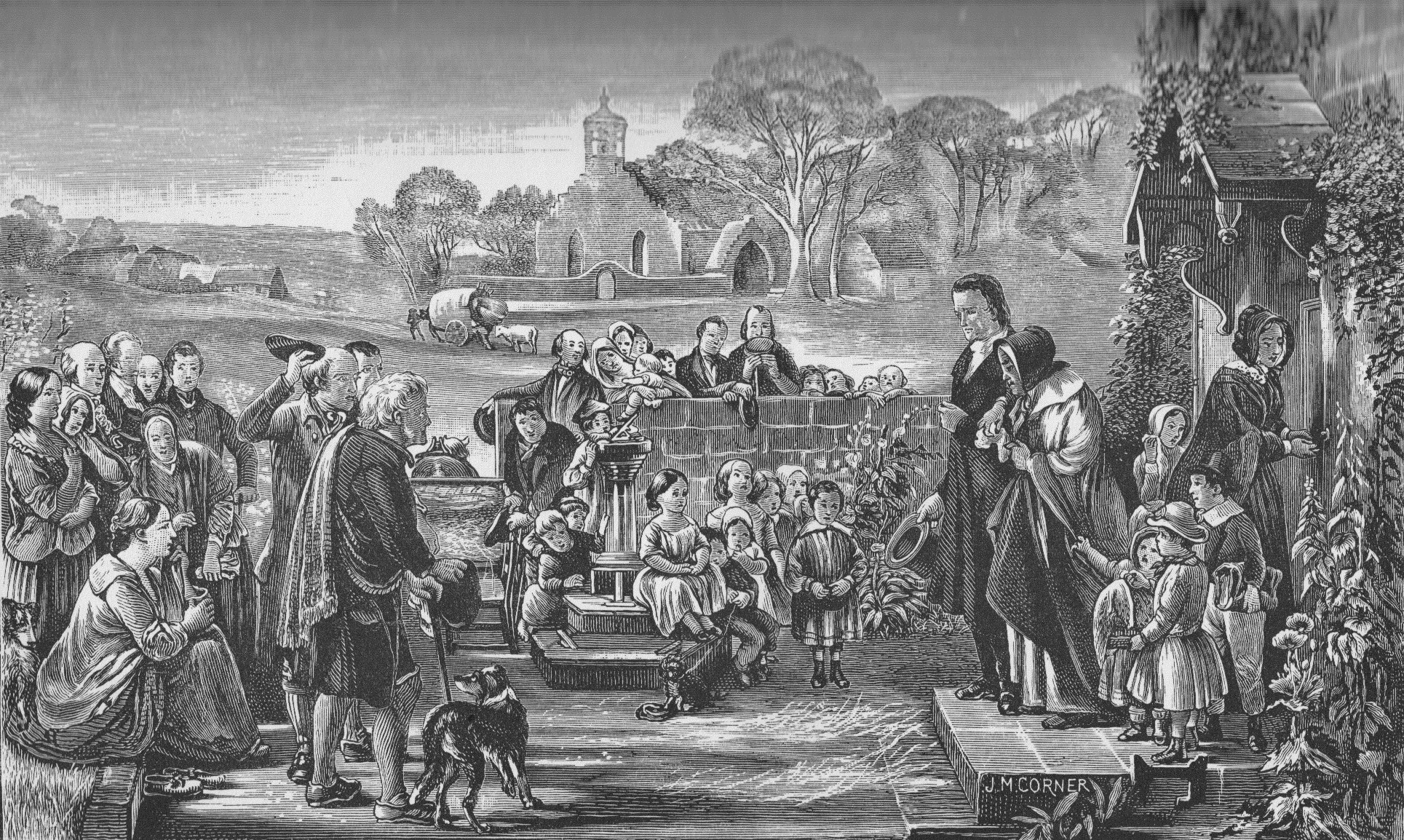
A minister and his family leaving their Church of Scotland manse during the Disruption (engraving J. M. Corner) based on Quitting The Manse (oil painting G. Harvey) – featuring Tullibody Old Kirk

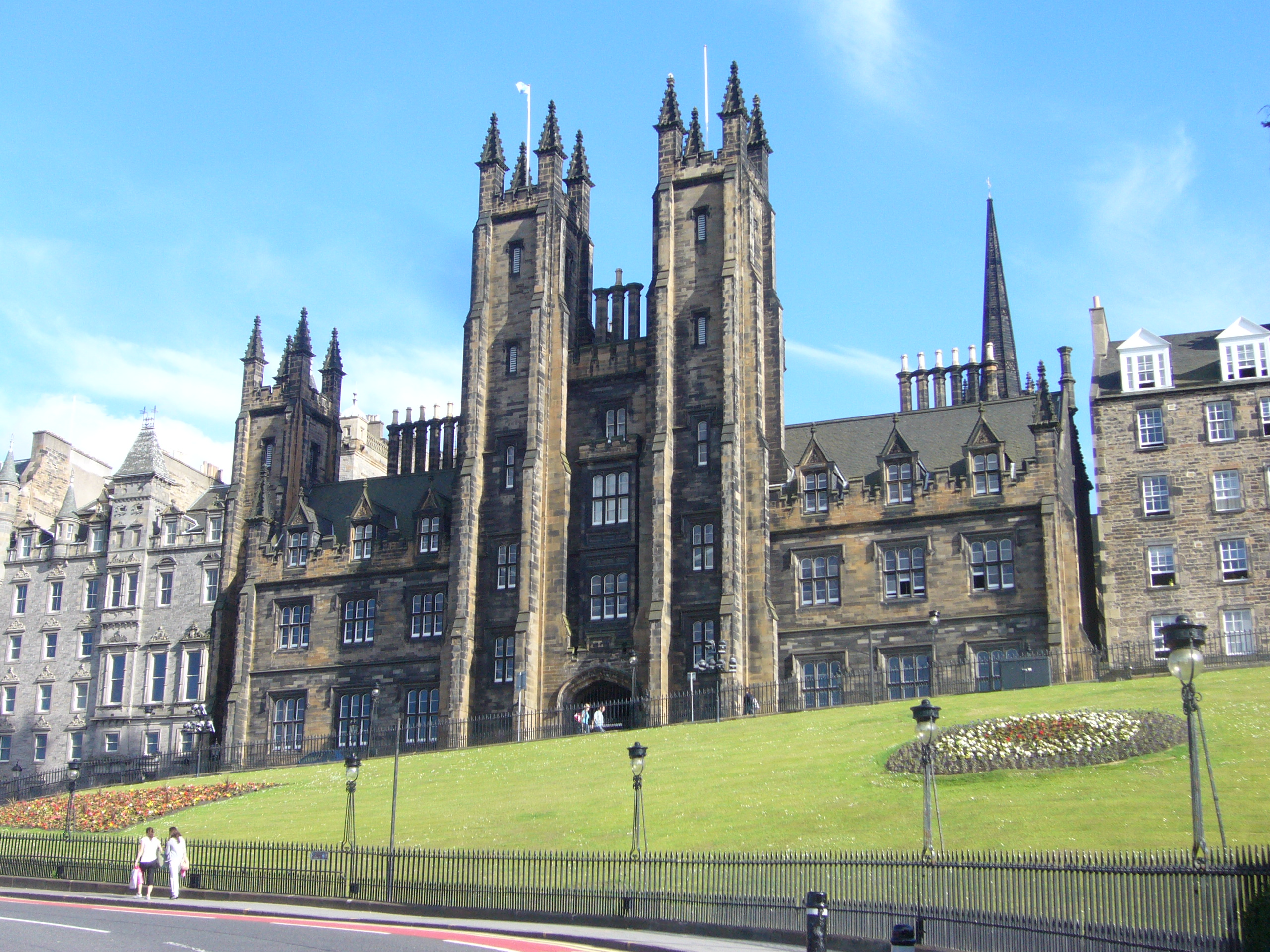
New College, on the Mound, designed by William Henry Playfair and built 1845–1850.

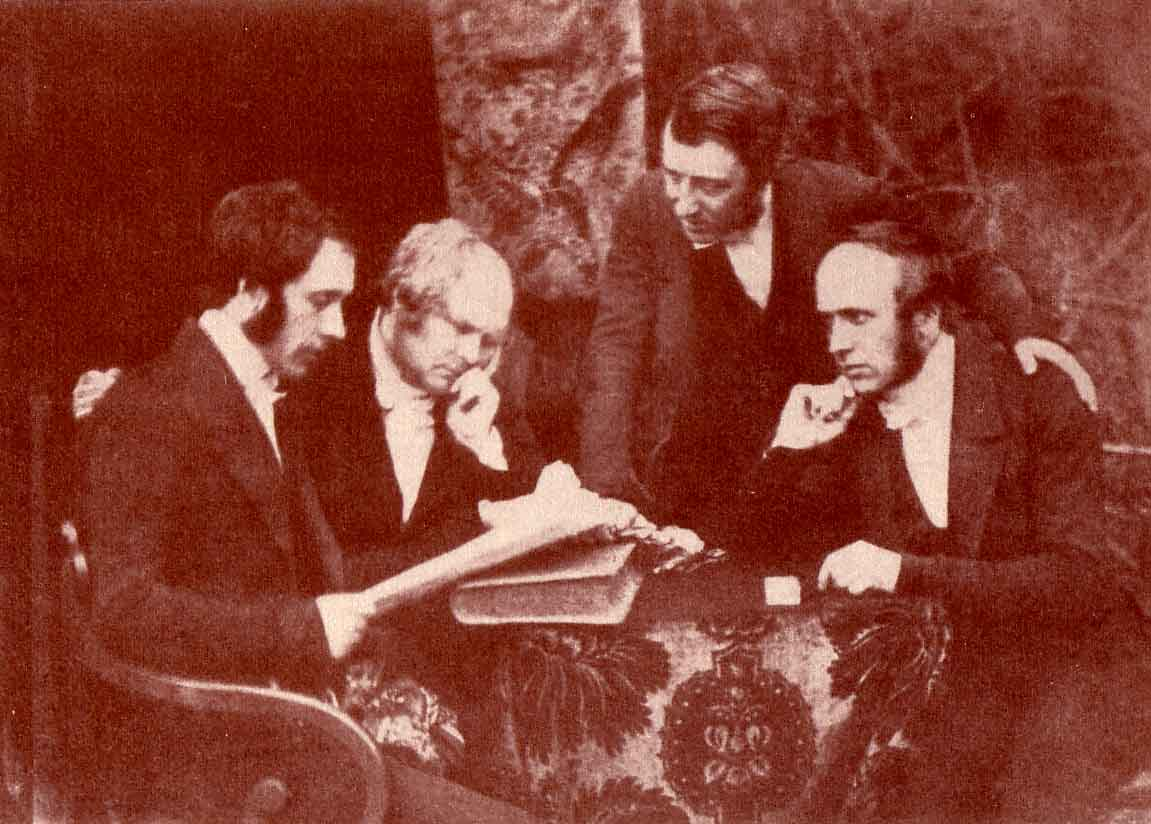
Hill & Adamson took photographic portraits of all the clergymen who had been at the assembly.

== In literature and the arts ==
The social tensions underlying the Disruption are the subject of William Alexander's novel, Johnny Gibb of Gushetneuk (1870). David Octavius Hill's use of photography to record the ministers who participated in the schism of 1843 features in Ali Bacon's novel In the Blink of an Eye (2018). The novel Clear (2024) by Carys Davies is set against the backdrop of the Great Disruption and the Highland Clearances.

== See also ==
- History of Scotland
- Religion in the United Kingdom
